= Petrus Jacobus Kipp =

Dutch apothecary, chemist and instrument maker

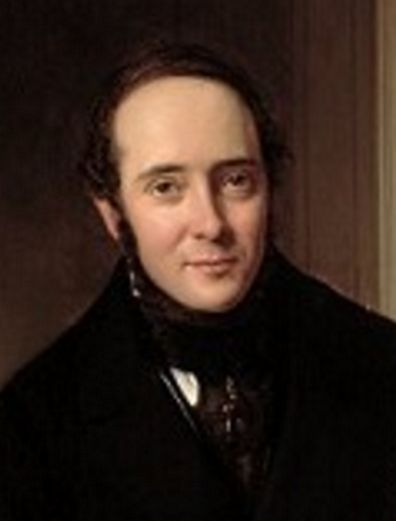
- Petrus Jacobus Kipp (1808-1864)
- Born: 5 March 1808; Utrecht
- Died: 3 February 1864 (aged 55); Delft
- Occupations: apothecary, chemist and instrument maker
- Known for: Kipp apparatus
- Spouse: Hanna Heijligers

Petrus Jacobus Kipp (Utrecht, 5 March 1808 – Delft, 3 February 1864) was a Dutch apothecary, chemist and instrument maker. He became known as the inventor of the Kipp apparatus, chemistry equipment for the development of gases.

== Biography ==
Kipp passed his pharmacist exam in 1829 in Utrecht University with a thesis on seven substances. When he found that, contrary to the academic medicine education with national value, his exam had mere local value, to start a pharmacy in faraway Delft, he had to pass a further test at the provincial medical council. At the beginning of the 19th century, in Delft as in other cities, there was a surplus of pharmacists. Many decided to combine their work with other activities. So too Kipp started in 1830 in Delft a trade in scientific instruments and chemicals. At first his chemicals business made most profit, but after publishing a catalogue in 1850 with instruments imported from Germany and France, his sales of instruments grew in importance.

In 1840, Kipp was elected into the medical council of the city of Delft. In this responsibility, he conducted various chemical investigations assigned by the authorities, e.g., of drinking water and of lamp oil used in street lighting. Many pharmacists in those times were working on professionalisation of the profession. Kipp was one of the founders in 1842 of the Nederlandsche Maatschappij ter Bevordering der Pharmacy (Dutch Company for the advancement of Pharmacy). Also in 1842, in Delft the Polytechnische Hogeschool was founded by King Willem II. The following year, Kipp's friend Carel Frederik Donnadieu was appointed Professor of Chemistry there. Between 1844 and 1850, Kipp earned extra money by translation of German chemistry books to Dutch for use at the university.

In 1842, Kipp published the results of research into the presence of arsenic in livers and kidneys in rabbits. For this research, he used an apparatus to generate hydrogen, which had been developed in 1836 by the English scientist James Marsh. Because the hydrogen production could not easily be stopped during the experiments, Kipp was dissatisfied with the design, and decided to develop his own gas generator. His first version was created by the German glassblower Heinrich Geißler; but was very fragile. The same year, Kipp made a new design, created again by Geißler. This design would be the model for all future versions of the Kipp's apparatus. In 1844, Kipp published two descriptions in the Tijdschrift voor Handel and Nijverheid (Journal for trade and industry). The oldest known copy of the apparatus is owned by the Boerhaave Museum in Leiden. It is 62 cm high and was made between 1845 and 1875.

Kipp was married with Hanna Petronella Regina Heijligers. Together they had ten children. After his death in 1864, his activities were continued by his wife and their sons Willem and Anton under the name of 'P.J. Kipp en Zonen.' Willem ran the pharmacy, later under his own name 'W.A. Kipp,' while Anton did the trade of chemicals and instruments. At the end of the 19th century, the own production of scientific and medical instruments grew in importance more than the import of foreign products. In 2008, the three companies still are active: the Delft pharmacy W.A. Kipp, the Delft instrument maker Kipp & Zonen, and the trade company Salm and Kipp.
