= Inox Air Products =

Indian industrial & medical gases company

INOX Air Products
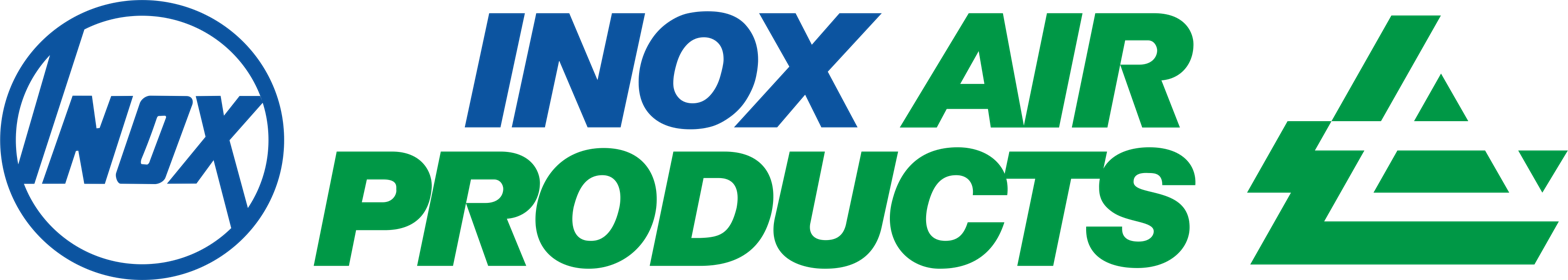
- Type: Private
- ISIN: INE321A01012
- Industry: Industrial gases
- Predecessor: Industrial Oxygen Company Private Limited
- Founded: 1963
- Founder: Devendra Kumar Jain
- Headquarters: Mumbai, India
- Area served: India
- Key people: Pavan Jain, Siddharth Jain
- Products: Argon; Carbon dioxide; Carbon monoxide; Helium; Hydrogen; Nitrogen; Medical and industrial oxygen; Rare gases
- Revenue: ▲₹1,558 crore (US$160 million) (2020)
- Operating income: ▲₹1,783 crore (US$190 million) (2021)
- Net income: ▲₹859 crore (US$89 million) (2021)
- Owner: Jain family Air Products & Chemicals.
- Parent: Inox Group; Air Products & Chemicals (49.74%)
- Website: inoxairproducts.com

INOX Air Products, also known as INOX AP, is the India-based industrial gas company. It is a joint venture between Industrial Oxygen Company and Air Products & Chemicals. The company is engaged in the manufacturing, trading, and supply of industrial and medical gases including oxygen, nitrogen, argon, hydrogen, helium, nitrous oxide, acetylene, and specialty gas mixtures.

== History ==
The company was established by the Jain family in the year 1963, as Industrial Oxygen Company Private Limited in Pune, India. In 1999, Air Products & Chemicals Inc., acquired a 50 percent equity stake in the company, and a new entity was incorporated; INOX Air Products.

The company is headquartered in Mumbai and it operates 44 plants across the country for supplying medical and industrial gases. During the COVID-19 pandemic, the company became one of the largest producers of medical oxygen by supplying it to hospitals across India.

== Operations ==
In West Bengal, INOX AP has the largest storage capacity of 1,000 tonnes and the pan-India distribution infrastructure. The company has been supplying medical Oxygen to hospitals in the state using its fleet of 54 specialized cryogenic tankers with a total trunking capacity of 380,000 liters of Oxygen.

It also operates an Ultra-High Purity Cryogenic Oxygen Plant in Modinagar in Ghaziabad district of Uttar Pradesh, a 1,250-tonnes per day (TPD) Air Separation Unit at Bokaro Steel Plant, a three air separation unit of combined 1700 TPD capacity at Hazira in partnership with ArcelorMittal and a 180 TPD Sriperumbudur plant in Tamil Nadu.

As of 2021, the company has a combined capacity to manufacture more than 3,300 tonnes per day (TPD) of liquid gases. The future expansions will push total liquid gases production to 4,800 TPD by 2024.

== Mergers and acquisitions ==
Belloxy was a joint venture between Linde plc and INOX Air Products. Later as per the directives given by Competition Commission of India, Linde had to divest its shareholding in the JV to address anti-competitive issues which arose due to its proposed merger with Praxair. In 2020, Linde's board approve the sale of Belloxy and the latter became a 100% subsidiary of INOX AP.

== Controversies ==
In the aftermath of the 2017 Gorakhpur hospital deaths, the company started selling medical oxygen directly to Baba Raghav Das Medical College Hospital but at a 17.5% higher than the previous price, which raised doubts on the new deal.

In 2022, an Appellate Authority for Advance Ruling of Tamil Nadu state ruled against the company and denied input tax credit under the Goods and Services Tax on leasehold rights acquired for the construction of air separation unit in the state.

== See also ==
- Category:Inox Group
- INOX Leisure
- Gujarat Fluorochemicals
