= Airgas =

Air Liquide company, that supplies industrial, medical and specialty gases

Airgas, An Air Liquide Company
- Company type: Subsidiary
- Industry: Gas
- Founded: 1982; 44 years ago
- Founder: Peter McCausland
- Headquarters: Radnor Township, Pennsylvania, United States
- Number of locations: 1100 retail locations
- Area served: North America
- Key people: Marcelo Fioranelli (Airgas CEO); Jay Worley (Airgas COO)
- Revenue: 5,314,000,000 United States dollar (2016)
- Net income: 337,500,000 United States dollar (2016)
- Total assets: 6,135,000,000 United States dollar (2016)
- Number of employees: 18,000(January 2018)
- Parent: Air Liquide
- Subsidiaries: Tech Air; Red-D-Arc Welderentals

Airgas, an Air Liquide company, is an American supplier of industrial, medical and specialty gases (delivered in packaged or cylinder form), as well as hardgoods and related products; one of the largest U.S. suppliers of safety products; and a leading U.S. supplier of ammonia products and process chemicals. The company is headquartered in Radnor Township, Pennsylvania.

== Business Activities ==
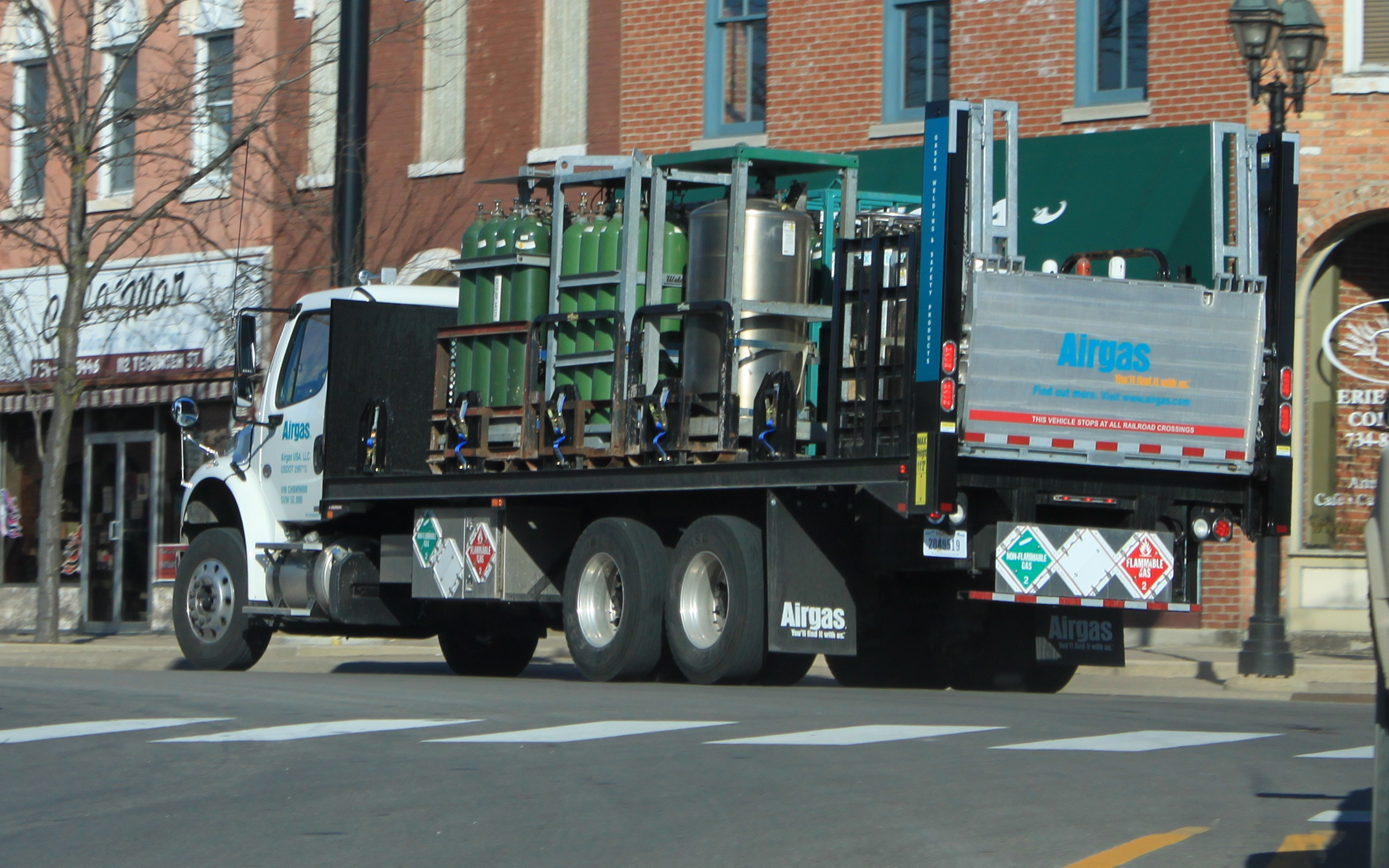
Airgas delivery truck Dundee, Michigan

Airgas, an Air Liquide company, is a supplier of gases, welding equipment and supplies, and safety products.

With more than one million customers, Airgas sells the following:

- Industrial, medical and specialty gases
- Welding equipment and supplies
- Safety products
- Atmospheric gases
- Carbon Dioxide
- Dry Ice
- Nitrous Oxide
- Ammonia
- Process Chemicals

The company has 18,000 employees in the following industries:

- Manufacturing and metal fabrication
- Non-residential construction (energy and infrastructure)
- Energy and chemicals (upstream, midstream and downstream)
- Life sciences and healthcare
- Food, beverage and retail services
- Materials and power
- Government, defense and aerospace

Its integrated network of about 1,400 locations includes branches, cylinder fill plants, production facilities, specialty gas laboratories, and regional distribution centers. Airgas markets through multiple channels, including its own branches and outside sales force, a Strategic Accounts Team focused on large customers, distributors and resellers, telesales, catalog and e-Business channels.

== History ==
Airgas was founded by chairman and chief executive officer Peter McCausland in 1982, and became a publicly traded company in 1986. Through more than 500 acquisitions and internal growth, Airgas built the largest national distribution network in the packaged gas industry. One of these acquisitions is Red-D-Arc Welderentals which was acquired in 1995 for an undisclosed fee.

On September 8, 2009, Airgas replaced Cooper Industries in the S&P500 index. In October 2009, John McGlade, the president and chief executive officer of Air Products, a competing concern, privately asked McCausland whether he'd be interested in merging the two companies. McCausland rejected the idea. In February 2010, Air Products initiated a public tender offer for Airgas. The offer was extended, and the price increased, throughout the subsequent year. Air Products abandoned the effort on February 15, 2011, after a decision by the Delaware Chancery Court that upheld Airgas's extensive use of a "poison pill" defense.

In November 2015, Airgas agreed to be acquired by France’s Air Liquide for a total of $13.4 billion. This deal was approved by the Airgas Board of Directors and shareholders. Airgas had previously avoided a $5.9 billion hostile takeover by Air Products and Chemicals. The acquisition was finalized and announced on May 23, 2016 and Airgas is now a wholly owned subsidiary of Air Liquide.

In 2019, Airgas signed a definitive agreement to acquire TA Corporate Holdings, Inc. (“Tech Air”), a large independent distributor of industrial gases and welding supplies serving various geographies in the United States.
