= Advanced Energy =

American multinational technology company

Coordinates: 40°33′56.29″N 105°1′50.1″W

Advanced Energy Industries, Inc.
- Company type: Public
- Traded as: Nasdaq: AEIS; S&P 400 component
- Industry: thin-film renewables (solar and glass): semiconductor; Flat panel display and OED; High-brightness LED (HBLED); Solar; Data storage; Architectural glass; Industrial coating; Analytical instruments; Medical equipment; Telecommunications network; Aerospace; Automotive; Food industry; Intrinsically safe; Metrology; Oil and gas; Pharmaceutical; Plastics; Research and others
- Founded: 1981; 45 years ago, in Fort Collins, Colorado
- Headquarters: Denver, Colorado, U.S.
- Area served: Worldwide
- Key people: Steve Kelley (president & CEO); Paul Oldham (executive vice president & CFO); Eduardo Bernal (EVP and COO); Tom McGimpsey (EVP and general counsel); Rory O’Byrne (SVP & chief people officer); Randy Heckman (SVP and CTO); Juergen Braun (SVP, Plasma Power Products); John Donaghey (SVP and global head of sales); Kevin Fairbairn (SVP, corporate development); Peter Gillespie (SVP of strategic and corporate marketing); Emdrem Tan (SVP High Volume Products); John Williams (SVP, industrial and medical products)
- Products: High and low voltage power systems; thermal measuring instruments; plasma power generators; remote plasma sources, electrostatic products; AC-DC and DC-DC power supplies; thyristor power controls; global support services; Digital Thermometers and Temperature Probes & Sensors; Intrinsically Safe Test & Measuring Instruments; Humidity Measurement Instruments; Microwave & RF Instruments; LCR Meters; Ohmmeters; Grounding & Bonding Instruments; Signal Source & Waveform Amplifiers; Ratio Standards and Electrical Safety Instruments
- Revenue: ▲US$1,850 million (FY 2022)
- Operating income: ▲US$299.5 million (FY 2022)
- Net income: ▲US$244.8 million (FY 2022)
- Total assets: ▲US$1,992.2 million (end of FY 2022)
- Total equity: ▲US$1,066.3 million (end of FY 2022)
- Number of employees: ~12,000 (end of FY 2022)
- Subsidiaries: SL Power Electronics
- Website: advancedenergy.com

Advanced Energy Industries, Inc. is an American multinational technology company headquartered in Denver, Colorado that develops precision power conversion, measurement and control technologies for the manufacture of semiconductors, flat panel displays, data storage products, telecommunications network equipment, industrial coatings, medical devices, solar cells and architectural glass.

== General ==
Founded in 1981 in Fort Collins, Colorado, USA, by Doug Schatz, Advanced Energy operates in regional centers in North America, Asia, and Europe, and offers global sales and support through direct offices, representatives, and distributors. The company has manufacturing facilities in the U.S., EMEA and Asia.

Advanced Energy produces products that are required for the manufacture of many plasma thin-film industries as well as semiconductor, flat panel displays, data storage, telecommunications networks, solar cells, medical devices and architectural glass.

Advanced Energy has a main factory in Simpang Ampat, Seberang Perai, Penang, Malaysia; the original Fort Collins headquarters is now a design and service center.

It once manufactured and sold gas-system products for semiconductor, but withdrew from the market of gas-system products. It also once manufactured utility-scale solar inverters.

== Products ==
Advanced Energy's Products include high and low voltage power systems, thermal measuring instruments, DC and RF plasma power generators, remote plasma sources, electrostatic products, AC/DC and DC-DC power supplies, and thyristor power controls. The company also offers services globally.

Its largest customers are Advanced Semiconductor Materials, Lam Research, Tokyo Electron, and more.

== Historical highlights and acquisitions ==
- 1981 Founded in Colorado, U.S.A. on May 5
- 1987 Japanese office opened
- 1990 German office opened
- 1993 UK office opened
- 1995 Listed on Nasdaq
- 1996 Korean office opened
- 1998 RF Power Products acquired
- 1999 Taiwan office opened
- 2000 China office opened
- 2001 Sekidenko acquired
- 2002 Aera Corporation acquired
- 2002 Litmas acquired
- 2002 Dressler (Dressler Hochfrequenztechnik GmbH & Dressler USA, Inc.) acquired
- 2007 Dressler site closed
- 2010 PV Powered acquired
- 2010 Mass flow controller business and gas cabinet business sold to Hitachi Metal (Japan). Temporarily withdrawing from the Japanese office.
- 2012 Solvix SA acquired
- 2013 RefuSol (Metzingen, Germany) acquired
- 2014 Power control modules (silicon-controlled rectifier controllers) section of AEG Power Solutions, Warstein-Belecke, Germany, acquired
- 2014 HiTek Power (UK) acquired
- 2014 UltraVolt (US) acquired
- 2017 Excelsys (IRL) acquired
- 2017 Japan office re-entry
- 2018 Israel office opened
- 2018 TREK Holdings (US) acquired
- 2018 Monroe Electronics (US) acquired
- 2018 LumaSense (US) acquired
- 2019 Divests Solar Inverter business
- 2019 Customer Solutions Center Karlstein am Main, Germany opened
- 2019 Artesyn Embedded Power (US) acquired
- 2022 SL Power acquired
- 2020 Advanced Energy STEM Diversity Scholarship Program introduced
- 2021 TEGAM acquisition
- 2021 Versatile Power acquisition
- 2024 Airity Technologies acquisition

== See also ==
- Solar inverter
- Switch mode power supply
- List of S&P 400 companies
