= Inert gas generator =

Device which burns fuel to produce inert gas

Inert gas generator (IGG) refers to machinery on board marine product tankers. Inert gas generators consist distinctively of a gas producer and a scrubbing system.

== Process ==
Diesel is burned using atmospheric air in a combustion chamber and the exhaust gas collected, the resulting exhaust gas contains less than 5% oxygen, thereby creating "inert gas", which mainly consist of nitrogen and partly carbon dioxide. The hot, dirty gas is then passed through a scrubbing tower which cleans and cools it using seawater. This gas is then delivered to cargo tanks to prevent explosion of flammable cargo.

This generator is sometimes confused with flue gas systems, which draw inert gas from the boiler systems of the ship. Flue gas systems do not have a burner but only "clean" and measure the air before delivering it to the cargo hold.

== See also ==
- gas generator
- Carbon dioxide generator
- industrial gas
