= Carbon dioxide generator =

A carbon dioxide generator or CO_{2} generator is a machine used to enhance carbon dioxide levels in order to promote plant growth in greenhouses or other enclosed areas. Carbon dioxide generators have been used to help grow marijuana. They can be fueled with propane or natural gas. CO_{2} generators were used mostly by commercial growers until smaller and less expensive systems made the technology more widely available to hobbyists. The generators also give off heat. Using compressed CO_{2} is an alternative to generators.

== See also ==
- Gas generator
- Inert gas generator
- Industrial gas
