= SL Industries =

American manufacturing company

Coordinates: 39.9359°N 74.9562°W

SL Industries, Inc.
- Type: Subsidiary
- Traded as: NYSE: SLI
- Industry: Diversified Electronics
- Founded: 1956; 70 years ago
- Headquarters: Mount Laurel, New Jersey, U.S.
- Key people: William T. Fejes (Chief Executive Officer, President); Louis J. Belardi (Chief Financial Officer, Principal Accounting Officer, Treasurer and Sec.)
- Products: Power electronics and motion control applications
- Revenue: $ 203.33M (Sep 30, 2013)
- Number of employees: 1400 (as of September 30, 2013)
- Parent: Advanced Energy (2022-present)
- Website: www.slindustries.com https://slpower.com/

SL Industries, Inc. is an American manufacturing company headquartered in Mount Laurel, New Jersey. The company provides products like power electronics, protection and quality, motion control, and communication equipment mainly to original equipment manufacturers (OEMs). There are four segments in the company to operate, namely SL Power Electronics Corp. (SLPE), High Power Group, SL Montevideo Technology, Inc. (SL-MTI), and RFL Electronics Inc. (RFL). The High Power Group consists of Teal Electronics Corporation (TEAL) and MTE Corporation.

== History ==
On March 29, 1956, the company was founded as G-L Electronics Company in New Jersey, and it has changed its name to G-L Industries, Inc. (1963), SGL Industries, Inc. (1970), and finally SL Industries, Inc. (1984) in its history of marketing in the power electronics and power protection industries. Its subsidiary SLPE was formed by the merger of Ault and Condor.

In 2016 SL Industries was acquired by Handy & Harman.

== Products ==
All of the company’s subsidiaries are ISO 9001 certified. SL Power Electronics Corp. focuses on power conversion products, such as AC/DC internal/ external switch mode power supplies and chargers. The High Power Group (under the Teal and MTE two brands) focuses on integrated power management systems, custom power conditioning for markets of medical imaging, military aerospace, semiconductor, solar photovoltaic(PV). It also provides line and load reactors, custom magnetic products, and a series of harmonic, RFI/EMI, and motor protection filters. The SL-MTI focuses on power density custom and build-to-print wound components for military, aerospace motor markets. The RFL focuses on power protection systems for electric utility transmission lines and apparatus. These products are microprocessor controlled, with digital communications capabilities (T1/E1, SONET/SDH, TDM over Internet). In 2013, RFL Electronics Inc. had a rebranding and introduced new solutions in response to the increasing rate of change faced by its customers.

== Research and development ==
In April 2013, SL Power Electronics introduced its GB60 single output, convection cooled, wide temperature range power supply providing 60 watts of power in ultracompact package of 2” x 3” x 1.35”. In May 2012, RFL Electronics Inc. won the “Best Telecom Equipment” of “UTC EXPO 2012 Product Award” for its eXmux 3500 TDM over IP access/transport multiplexer at the UTC Telecom 2012 Conference. eXmux 3500 enabling transition from TDM based networks to an IP-based infrastructure with qualified communications channels.
