= Mox-Linde Gases =

- Formerly: Malaysia Oxygen Berhad (MOX)
- Type: Private Limited Company
- Industry: Chemical industry
- Founded: 1960
- Headquarters: Petaling Jaya, Malaysia
- Parent: Linde plc
- Website: https://www.linde.com/global-locations

Mox-Linde Gases Sdn. Bhd. (formerly known as Malaysia Oxygen Berhad or MOX) was a Malaysian industrial gases company. Established in 1960, MOX specialised in providing gas solutions, namely manufacturing and distributing industrial, special and medical gases, installations of gas equipment, pipelines and engineering services. MOX also offered packaged chemicals, welding and consumables products.

MOX is now a member of The Linde Group through share buyout in 2007.

MOX has 21 plants nationwide in industrial parks such as Shah Alam, Bayan Lepas, Kulim, Pasir Gudang and Kerteh. The company also has sales centers in major towns in Malaysia.

In 2010, MOX-Linde was named the Manufacturer of the Year in the large companies category by the Federation of Malaysian Manufacturers (FMM).

In 2012, the company was rebranded as Linde Malaysia.
