= Cylinder manifold =

Gas cylinders

A cylinder manifold is system of pipes and valves for using a group of gas cylinders, or boil-off from vacuum insulated evaporators, to feed a single supply line. The advantages of the manifold system as compared with using a single cylinder are increased capacity and reliability, and also the possibility of a centralized supply for multiple users. The two main design aspects are use of a banks of cylinder connected in parallel and switch-over among different banks.

By drawing from more than one cylinder simultaneously, a greater total amount of gas is available, which means the system does not need to have the cylinders replaced as often. The number of cylinders connected at a time can be varied, and a large supply can be provided while still using reasonably small cylinders.

By having valves to enable switching between banks, one set of cylinders can be taken off-line while another is on-line. This prevents the need for down-time during replacement of a set of cylinders. Systems might have electrical or mechanical controls that automatically switch from an in-use bank that becomes depleted to the other bank that is on stand-by. These features are especially important for some hospital and industrial settings that have a critical need for uninterrupted supply.
