= Messer Group =

German industrial gas supplier

Messer SE & Co. KGaA

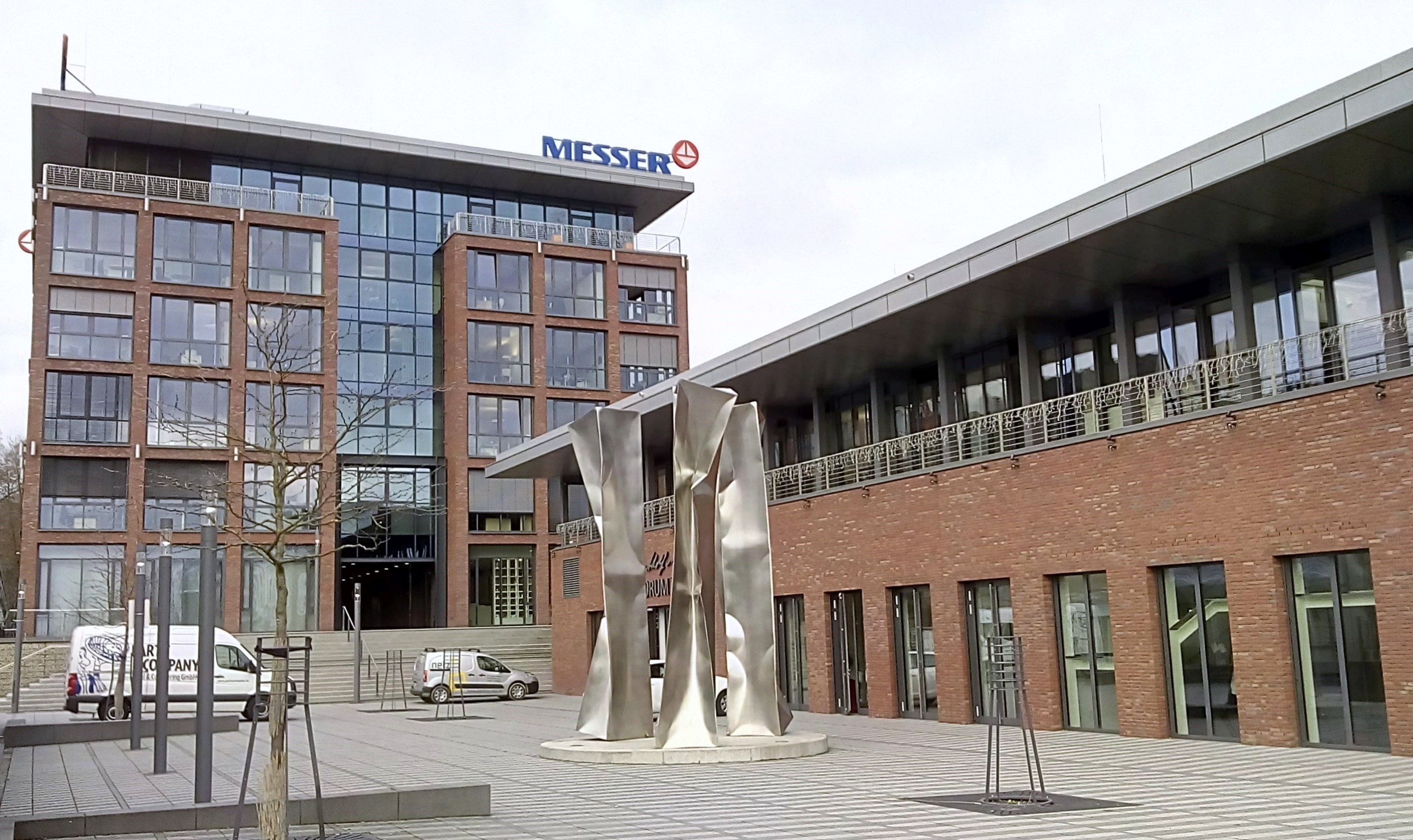
- HQ Messer-Forum in Bad Soden am Taunus
- Type: SE, Kommanditgesellschaft auf Aktien
- Industry: Chemicals
- Founded: 1898; 128 years ago
- Headquarters: Bad Soden, Germany
- Key people: Stefan Messer (Chairman); Peter Mohnen (CEO)
- Products: Industrial gases, fine chemicals
- Revenue: €4.5 billion (2025)
- Number of employees: 12,257 (2025)
- Website: www.messergroup.com

The Messer SE & Co. KGaA, previously known as Messer Group GmbH, is a supplier of industrial gases with headquarters in Bad Soden (Germany). Stefan Messer, grandson of company founder Adolf Messer, is Chairman of the family company's Supervisory Board.

The company is considered the world's biggest family-owned industrial gas company with activities in Europe, Asia, North- and South America. In 2023, it was valued at upwards of €12 billion.

== History ==
=== Founding and early years ===
Adolf Messer was a 20-year-old student when he founded the Acetylen-Gas-Gesellschaft Messer & Cie in 1898. The company manufactured acetylene gas generators and lighting systems in Frankfurt Höchst. Within the first seven years, around 300 appliances were exported.

Reacting to the emergence of electrical lighting, the company shifted its focus towards cutting and welding. It developed its first hydrogen-oxygen cutting torch in 1903. Adolf Messer also engaged in air separation. The company’s first oxygen plant, located in Spain, started operation in 1910.

In the years before World War I, Adolf Messer exported a number of air separation units and expanded the company’s activities both domestically and internationally. The outbreak of the war in 1914 put an end to this growth. The production facilities mostly remained intact throughout the war, but assets in the United Kingdom and the United States were lost because of it. After 1918, Adolf Messer prioritized regaining export markets. In the 1920s, the company re-established international contacts in the cutting and welding sector.

In the years leading to World War II, the company primarily handled orders from the arms industry and was active in the construction of special machines. It also participated in rocket weapon research. In addition, Messer worked on improving resistance welding technology, and the company’s electrical welding equipment was used for the joining of tank walls. The company developed a space-curve oxygen cutting machine, which enabled three-dimensional work on contoured armored cupolas for military vehicles. During wartime, forced laborers were employed in the production of arms components and in war-essential chemical development. Messer's production facilities gradually ceased operations during the last months of the war in 1945. In the following years, the company re-established relationships with international partners, resuming cooperation, among others, with the Société Française des Appareils et Procédés in April 1946.

Founder Adolf Messer died in 1954, a year after having transferred the company’s leadership to his son, Hans Messer.

=== Expansion ===
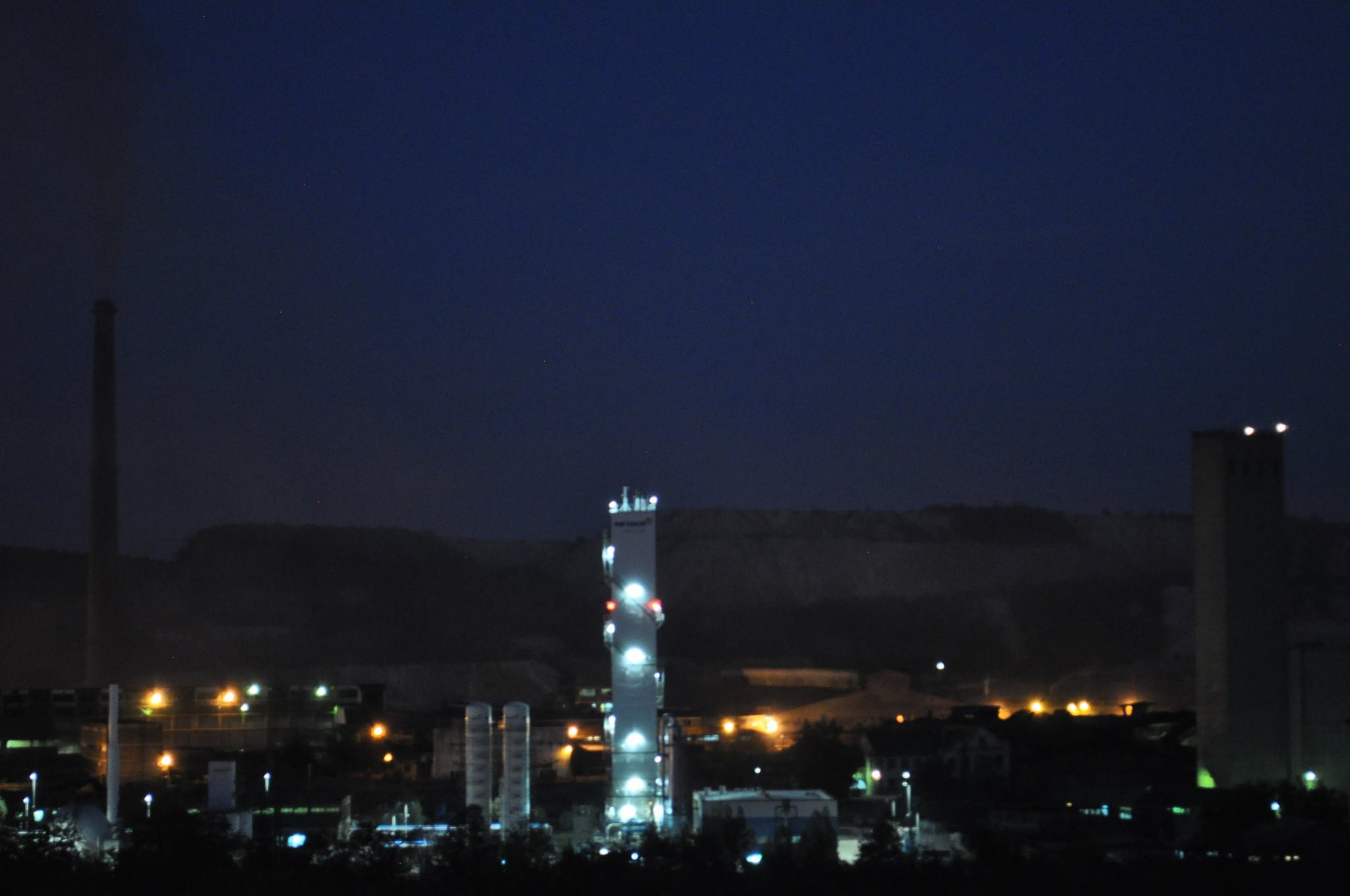
"Cold box" - Messer Tehnogas AD Bor, Serbia

In 1965, Messer merged with Knapsack Griesheim AG, a subsidiary of Hoechst AG, to form the new Messer Griesheim GmbH. After the merger, Hoechst held two-thirds of the shares.

In this new structure, the company continued to grow and hit the threshold of one billion Deutsche Mark in sales in 1978. The industrial gases business was the biggest contributor, accounting for around 70 percent of total sales. Research and development created new applications for compressed and liquefied gases, gas mixtures and specialty gases. The company’s success also went hand in hand with the acquisition of new clients and partners. After the collapse of the Soviet bloc in 1990, business activities were expanded into Eastern and Central Europe. The years 1994 and 1995 marked the start of business activities in China.

In 1993, Hans Messer stepped down as CEO but remained active for the company as member of the shareholders' committee and of the supervisory board until his death in 1997. The new CEO Herbert Rudolf had previously managed Messer's business in the United States. Under his leadership, the company’s level of debt quadrupled within four years.

In the 1990s, the Hoechst Group changed its corporate strategy, which subsequently led to a change in the direction of Messer Griesheim. Led by a new CEO, Hoechst focused on its core businesses of pharmaceutics and chemicals. This realignment led to disagreement between Hoechst and the Messer family and to a dispute about the future ownership structure of Messer Griesheim. A planned IPO failed as did the planned sale of Hoechst’s shares to the gas industry competitor Linde AG.

=== Back to family ownership ===
Stefan Messer, grandson of the founder, entered Messer Griesheim’s management in 1998. In the following year, the Messer family bought the Messer Cutting & Welding subsidiary from Messer Griesheim GmbH. Also in 1999, Hoechst merged with Aventis and the Messer shares were transferred to Aventis. In 2001, Aventis sold these Messer shares to the investment companies Goldman Sachs and Allianz Capital Partners, who sold them to the Messer family in 2004.

With this acquisition, the company returned to full family ownership under the name of Messer Group GmbH. As part of this transaction, the national businesses in Germany, the United Kingdom, and the United States were sold to Air Liquide for approximately €2.7 billion. This was bound to a four-year non-compete clause for the Messer Group, prohibiting the company from selling gases under the Messer brand name in the three countries. Messer Group sidestepped by founding the Gase.de Vertriebs-GmbH for selling gases in Germany. When the non-compete clause expired in 2008, Messer Group re-entered the industrial gas business under the Messer brand.

In 2011, the company headquarters moved from Sulzbach to the neighboring town of Bad Soden.

In 2018, Messer signed a supply contract with Rütgers Germany, a subsidiary of Rain Carbon Inc. Messer agreed to supply hydrogen over a period of 15 years and invest in a hydrogen production facility at the Rain carbon site. The facility is also used to supply other customers. A year later, Messer acquired the right to operate in North America and in South America as a result of the Linde-Praxair merger. Regulatory approval required the divestment of these rights. The acquired businesses were not integrated into the group but consolidated in a joint venture with CVC Capital Partners. CVC’s shares were acquired by Messer in 2023.

Since 2021, the company has been operating as Messer SE & Co. KGaA. In 2023, Bernd Eulitz was appointed CEO while Stefan Messer became Chairman of the Supervisory Board.

== Company structure ==
The Messer SE & Co. KGaA is the management holding company of the Messer Group, an international supplier of industrial, medical, and specialty gases. The majority of the company’s shares is owned by the founding family and the Dr. Hans Messer Stiftung. Since February 2022, Bernd Eulitz was acting as CEO; Stefan Messer holds the position of Chairman of the Supervisory Board. Effective July 1st, 2026, Peter Mohnen will assume the role of CEO of Messer.

The group’s 12,257 employees generated sales of €4.5 billion in 2025.

== Products ==
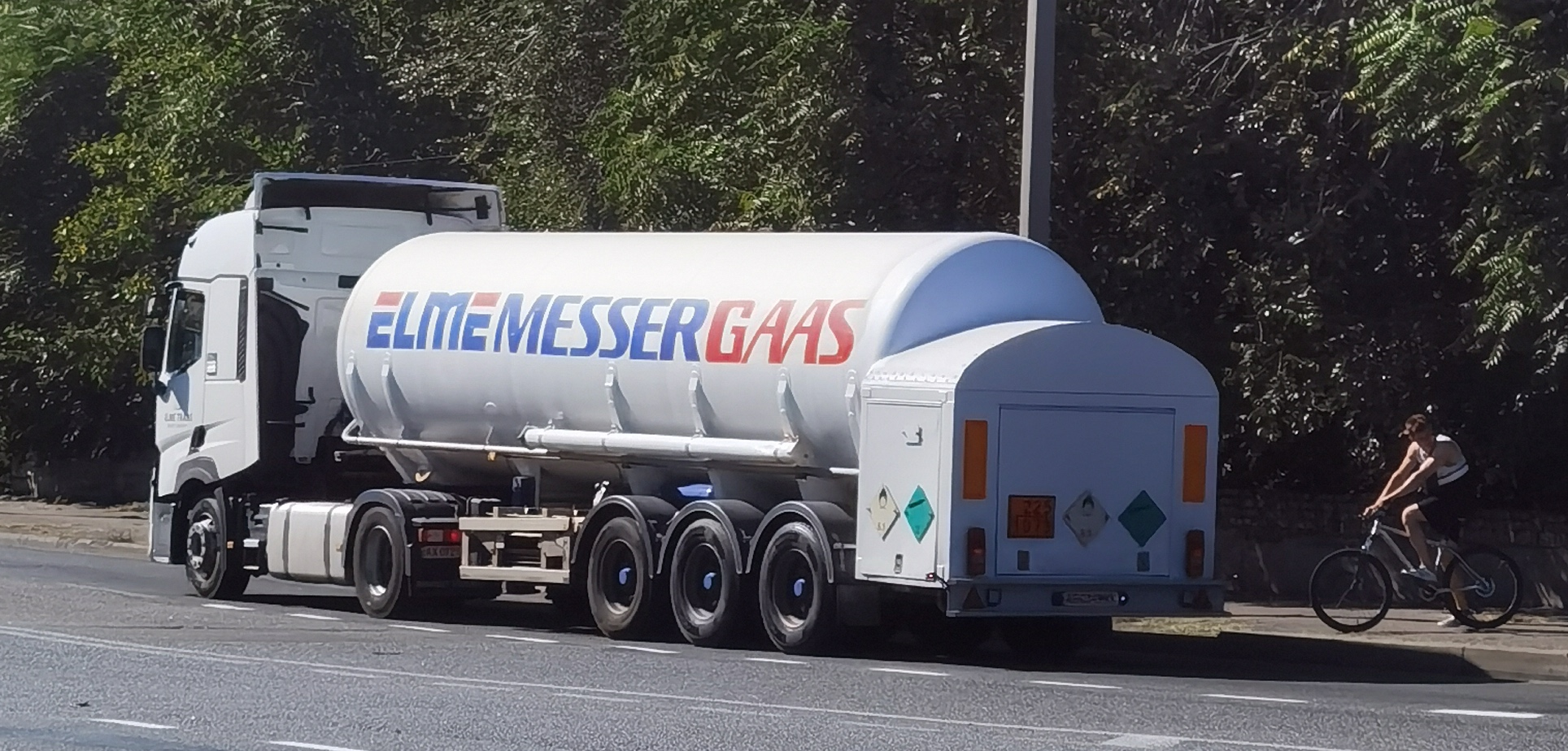
Elme Messer gas truck.

Messer produces and supplies a range of gases, including oxygen, nitrogen, argon, carbon dioxide, hydrogen, helium, shielding gases for welding, specialty gases, medical gases, food gases, and various gas mixtures.

The products are used in industries such as environmental protection, pharma, medicine, food and beverage, steel and metal, cutting and welding, 3D printing, construction, science and research.

Under the name of ZeCarb, Messer offers services for decarbonization projects. These services target industries with high emission levels and are designed to reduce the carbon dioxide emissions of its customers.

=== Incidents ===
On January 28, 2021, a Messer liquid nitrogen freezer installed at a poultry processing plant in Gainesville, Georgia released nitrogen gas and killed six people and seriously injured three others. Although redundant systems were ostensibly in place to prevent such a release, these systems had a single point of failure in the freezer's so-called bubbler tube.

=== Research ===
In its competence centers, Messer Group develops application technologies for the use of gases in various industrial sectors, in food technology, medicine, as well as research and science. These centers are located, among other places, in Germany, Austria, Hungary, and China.

In the field of green hydrogen technology for industrial and mobility applications, Messer entered a cooperation with Siemens Energy in 2021.
