= Gas evolution reaction =

A gas evolution reaction is a chemical reaction in which one of the end products is a gas such as oxygen or carbon dioxide. Gas evolution reactions may be carried out in a fume chamber when the gases produced are poisonous when inhaled or explosive.

== Examples ==
- A replacement reaction concerning zinc metal and dilute sulfuric acid.

$$\ce{Zn + H_2SO_4 (dil) -> ZnSO_4 + H_2 ^}$$
In this example, diatomic hydrogen gas is released. Dilute hydrochloric acid can be used in place of dilute sulfuric acid.

- A replacement reaction where gaseous hydrogen chloride and fluorine gas react to release diatomic chlorine gas (because fluorine is more electronegative):

$$\ce{2HCl + F_2 -> 2HF + Cl_2 ^}$$

== See also ==
- Gasogene
- Kipps apparatus
- Gas generator
- Thermal decomposition
- Oxygen evolution
