= Rotarex =

The ROTAREX Group is a privately owned Luxembourgish group of companies who develop and manufacture high pressure valves, tube fittings and pressure regulators for almost all types of gas, in almost all application fields. Founded in 1922, under the name CEODEUX in Lintgen, Luxembourg, ROTAREX currently employs approximately 1600 people and is present on all continents with a broad range of products.

== Structure ==
The ROTAREX Group is composed of 5 Divisions:

CEODEUX Division

CEODEUX Division is subdivided in 2 main parts:

- Cylinder valves ( valves that are used for gas storage and transportation and are on a gas cylinder or storage tank)
- Equipment ( Valves, Fittings, Regulators, Couplings, Filters, Hoses etc. for gas installations)

LPG Division (SRG)

- All types of valves, fittings and regulators for LPG (Liquefied petroleum gas)

Firetec Division

- Valves and systems for fire extinguishing

Solutions Division

- Valves, pressure regulators and systems for water, beverage carbonation and other applications

Automotive Division

- Valves, regulators and fittings for Automotive applications with CNG (Compressed natural gas), Hydrogen and LPG

Subcontracting Division

- Machining, turning, tooling and Plastic injection

== Application fields ==
ROTAREX products are used in just about any application field where gas is used
Just a short list of examples: Industrial gases, breathing and medical gases, food & beverage, fire protection, cryogenics & refrigeration, laboratories, semiconductor industry, aerospace, petrochemical, automotive, welding, transportation & storage, diving, leisure industry, paintball, barbecue and many more.

== Purity ==
ROTAREX products can meet any standard of gas purity on the market, ranging from Industrial gases, Breathing quality and Ultra High Purity (UHP) gases (for the semiconductor industry for example)
