= Nitrogen rejection unit =

A nitrogen rejection unit (NRU) selectively removes nitrogen from a gas. The name can be applied to any system that removes nitrogen from natural gas.

For high flow-rate applications, typically above 420 thousand cubic metres (15 million cubic feet) per day at standard pressure, cryogenic processing is the norm. This is a distillation process which utilizes the different volatilities of methane (boiling point of −161.6 °C) and nitrogen (boiling point of −195.69 °C) to achieve separation. In this process, a system of compression and distillation columns drastically reduces the temperature of the gas mixture to a point where methane is liquified and the nitrogen is not. For smaller applications, a series of heat exchangers may be used as an alternative to distillation columns.

For smaller volumes of gas, a system utilizing pressure swing adsorption (PSA) is a more typical method of separation. In PSA, methane and nitrogen can be separated by using an adsorbent with an aperture size very close to the molecular diameter of the larger species, in this case methane (3.8 angstroms). This means nitrogen is able to diffuse through the adsorbent, filling adsorption sites, whilst methane is not. This results in a purified natural gas stream that fits pipeline specifications. The adsorbent can then be regenerated, leaving a highly pure nitrogen stream. PSA is a flexible method for nitrogen rejection, being applied to both small and large flow rates.

The operating conditions of various PSA units are quite variable. Depending on the vendor, high degrees of pretreatment of the gas stream (removal of water vapor and heavy hydrocarbons) may be necessary for the system to operate optimally and without damage to the adsorbent material. Moreover, the degree of hydrocarbon recoveries (75% vs 95%) and purities can vary considerably. The economic viability of any PSA unit will be highly dependent on such factors.

An estimated 25% of the US natural gas reserves contain unacceptably large quantities of nitrogen. Nitrogen is inert and lowers the energy value per volume of natural gas. It also takes up capacity in pipelines that could be used for valuable methane.

Pipeline specifications for nitrogen are extremely variable, though no more than 4% nitrogen is a typical specification.
