= Packaging gas =

Gas used to pack sensitive materials

A packaging gas is used to pack sensitive materials such as food into a modified atmosphere environment. The gas used is usually inert, or of a nature that protects the integrity of the packaged goods, inhibiting unwanted chemical reactions such as food spoilage or oxidation. Some may also serve as a propellant for aerosol sprays like cans of whipped cream. For packaging food, the use of various gases is approved by regulatory organisations.

In the food sector (modified atmosphere packaging, MAP), the gas composition—typically N₂/CO₂ and, depending on the product, O₂—is selected to manage respiration and microbial growth; the atmosphere is applied by flushing the pack or by in-line injection. FAO guidance describes principles and uses, while manufacturer application notes provide examples of common gases and supply arrangements used in industry.

Their E numbers are included in the following lists in parentheses.

== Inert and Nonreactive gases ==
These gas types do not cause a chemical change to the substance that they protect.

- argon (E938), a inert gas used for canned products
- helium (E939), a inert gas used for canned products
- nitrogen (E941), a nonreactive packaging gas and propellant
- carbon dioxide (E290), a nonreactive packaging gas and propellant

== Propellant gases ==
Specific kinds of packaging gases are aerosol propellants. These process and assist the ejection of the product from its container.

- chlorofluorocarbons known as CFC (E940 and E945), now rarely used because of the damage that they do to the ozone layer:
  - dichlorodifluoromethane (E940)
  - chloropentafluoroethane (E945)
- nitrous oxide (E942), used for aerosol whipped cream canisters (see Nitrous oxide: Aerosol propellant)
- octafluorocyclobutane (E946)

== Reactive gases ==
These must be used with caution as they may have adverse effects when exposed to certain chemicals. They will cause oxidisation or contamination to certain types of materials.

- oxygen (E948), used e.g. for packaging of vegetables
- hydrogen (E949)

== Volatile gases ==
Hydrocarbon gases approved for use with food need to be used with extreme caution as they are highly combustible, when combined with oxygen they burn very rapidly and may cause explosions in confined spaces. Special precautions must be taken when transporting these gases.

- butane (E943a)
- isobutane (E943b)
- propane (E944)

== See also ==
- Shielding gas
- Modified atmosphere packaging
