= Gas generator =

Device that burns fuel to produce large volumes of relatively cool gas

A gas generator is a device for generating gas. A gas generator may create gas by a chemical reaction or from a solid or liquid source, when storing a pressurized gas is undesirable or impractical.

The term often refers to a device that uses a rocket propellant to generate large quantities of gas. The gas is typically used to drive a turbine rather than to provide thrust as in a rocket engine. Gas generators of this type are used to power turbopumps in rocket engines, in a gas-generator cycle.

It is also used by some auxiliary power units to power electric generators and hydraulic pumps.

Another common use of the term is in the industrial gases industry, where gas generators are used to produce gaseous chemicals for sale. For example, the chemical oxygen generator, which delivers breathable oxygen at a controlled rate over a prolonged period.

Other types include the gas generator in an automobile airbag, which is designed to rapidly produce a specific quantity of inert gas.

== Common applications ==
=== As a power source ===
The V-2 rocket used hydrogen peroxide decomposed by a liquid sodium permanganate catalyst solution as a gas generator. This was used to drive a turbopump to pressurize the main LOX-ethanol propellants. In the Saturn V F-1 and Space Shuttle main engine, some of the main propellant was burned to drive the turbopump (see gas-generator cycle and staged combustion cycle). The gas generator in these designs uses a highly fuel-rich mix to keep flame temperatures relatively low.

The Space Shuttle auxiliary power unit and the F-16 emergency power unit (EPU) use hydrazine as a fuel. The gas drives a turbine which drives hydraulic pumps. In the F-16 EPU it also drives an electric generator.

Gas generators have also been used to power torpedoes. For example, the US Navy Mark 16 torpedo was powered by hydrogen peroxide.

A concentrated solution of hydrogen peroxide is known as high-test peroxide and decomposes to produce oxygen and water (steam).

$$\ce{2 H2O2 -> 2 H2O + O2}$$

Hydrazine decomposes to mixtures of nitrogen, hydrogen and ammonia. The reaction is strongly exothermic and produces high volume of hot gas from small volume of liquid.

1. $\ce{3 N2H4 -> 4 NH3 + N2}$
2. $\ce{N2H4 -> N2 + 2 H2}$
3. $\ce{4 NH3 + N2H4 -> 3 N2 + 8 H2}$

Many solid chemical rocket propellant compositions can be used as gas generators.

=== Inflation and fire suppression ===
Many automobile airbags use sodium azide for inflation (as of 2003). A small pyrotechnic charge triggers its decomposition, producing nitrogen gas, which inflates the airbag in around 30 milliseconds. A typical airbag in the US might contain 130 milligrams of sodium azide.

Similar gas generators are used for fire suppression.

Sodium azide decomposes exothermically to sodium and nitrogen.

$$\ce{2 NaN3 -> 2 Na + 3 N2}$$

The resulting sodium is hazardous, so other materials are added, e.g. potassium nitrate and silica, to convert it to a silicate glass.

=== Oxygen generation ===
A chemical oxygen generator delivers breathable oxygen at a controlled rate over a prolonged period. Sodium, potassium, and lithium chlorates and perchlorates are used.

== See also ==
- Carbon dioxide generator
- Flux switching alternator
- Industrial gas
- Kipp's apparatus
- Gas evolution reaction
