= Gas cabinet =

Device for containing gas cylinders

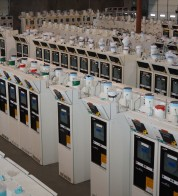
Photos of reconditioned gas cabinets

A gas cabinet is a metallic enclosure which is used to provide local exhaust ventilation system for virtually all of the gases used or generated in the semiconductor, solar, MEMS, NANO, solar PV, manufacturing and other advanced technologies.

The primary purpose of gas cabinets is to contain potential leaks in piping and fittings at the cylinder connection. The cabinet must be exhausted by a specifically designed fan and exhaust system. The cabinet exhaust system draws leaking hazardous gasses out of the cabinet. In the case of a flammable gas the cabinet will contain the flame for a period of time. One can use a newly reconditioned cabinet as well as non-reconditioned used gas cabinets depending on their requirements.

== Features ==
There are a variety of gas cabinets available in the market in different gas cylinder configurations, such as 1, 2 and 3 bottle designs. They can be either new, used, or reconditioned. A gas cylinder cabinet can have many features depending on the specific gas. These features include gas sensor, sprinkler head, excess flow sensor, automatic operation with automatic purging and excess pressure sensor.

They should meet the Uniform Fire Code Specifications and the National Fire Protection Association. They need to adhere to the Compressed Gas Association and Semiconductor Equipment & Materials Institute codes. It is also important to know whether the cabinet is OSHA compliant. OSHA offers additional safety precautions involving the use of gas cabinets. In the absence of finite specifications or unknowns the user or designer should seek the assistance of an impartial consultant.

Reconditioned gas cabinets can be more useful than non-reconditioned used gas cabinets because of the thorough process used in professionally reconditioning and testing to ensure all systems meet manufacturer’s specifications. Different types of gas cabinets can be used, depending on the gas type in the cylinder. Automatic gas cabinets with multiple sensors are useful and fulfill many other requirements.

A gas cabinet can also be manufactured specifically for a company's needs and at lower cost. It is required that a gas cabinet is used for fire safety for gas cylinders. The requirements vary by state. Many states have no advanced regulations for hazardous industrial gasses since there is little or no use of such gasses in that state.

== Types ==
The gas cabinets are categorized into four popular types based on the type of gas. The categories are:

=== Manual ===
These gas cabinets are used for inert, non-reactive and non-toxic gases. There are automatic gas cabinets also available and thus these cabinets are less useful when compared to automatic cabinets.

=== Fully automatic ===
These cabinets are available for corrosive, toxic and reactive gases. They provide safe and clean delivery of ultra-high purity gases. Such systems are designed to monitor a huge number of facility inputs and process sensors as per requirements.

=== Auto changeover ===
These gas cabinets are useful when uninterrupted gas flow is required. Auto changeover gas cabinets can be defined by mass or pressure inputs. There is software also available for multiple cylinder scales on each joint or bank. Purge down and purge up processes can also be performed without any interruption of connected cylinders.

== Valve Ports ==
The port and valve specifications for gas cabinets and distribution systems are an important part of the selection process.

=== Valve Types ===
Gas cabinets may be distinguished by the types of valves used to control flow. Manual valves. Valves are manually adjusted or deployed via a control knob, lever, or other manual device. Solenoid valves. Valves are opened and closed via a solenoid magnet deployed by an electrical signal. Air pilot valves. Valves are deployed via a pneumatic signal.

=== Port Types ===
Ports are openings in the manifold or distribution system where the inlet and outlet connections are produced. Each opening is either an inlet (supply) port or an outlet port. The number of each corresponds to the requirements of the application. The quantity of supply ports specifies the number of independent fluid supplies that could be interfaced with the manifold or manifold system.

The number of outlet ports establishes the number of outlets in the system. This is frequently specified as number of ports or valves that are or can be attached to the manifold. For example, an 8-point manifold has 8 ports or valves. Ports are sized based roughly on tube or pipe size with some important choices. For industrial gases it is possible to purchase manifolds made of Stainless steel pipe or copper and brass although both these materials are giving way to Stainless steel tubing. (Note differences between Tubing and Pipe). Connection choices might be NPT, VCO, Flare or other types.

For gas service that is "Clean For Oxygen Service (CFOS)" or for Ultra Pure service, manifolds and change over assemblies are typically made from 1/4" OD, 316 L, Electropolished tubing (the ID is Electropolished). The fittings used for ports and other connections are exclusively the "VCR" fitting. Training is needed to properly handle and install VCR connections using a variety of non-resuseable crushable metal gasket materials. Metal gaskets are essential in order to achieve high helium leak ratings.

== Specifications ==
The specifications for a gas cabinet detail everything from gas flow rates to the physical size of the system.

=== Maximum pressure ===
Pressure describes the amount of force exerted on a system by the contained and pressurized gas. Most compressed gases will not exceed 2,000 to 2,640 pounds per square inch gage (psig), but some can reach pressures of 6,000 psig. The system's weakest point determines the pressure limit, so any parts weakened by heat, corrosion, or stress may potentially lower the maximum pressure of the system or cause the vessel to rupture. Many times this is at the point of welds.

=== Maximum flow ===
Flow rate details the maximum rate of flow of the gas through the operation, typically measured in standard cubic feet per minute (scfm).

=== Temperature range ===
Temperature range is the full mandated range of safe ambient or fluid operating temperatures, given in degrees Fahrenheit or degrees Celsius.

=== Dimensions ===
Size dimensions specify the physical size of the gas cabinet, distribution system, or its components. Cabinet size - Indicates the physical size of the gas cabinet or the body of the distribution system. Port/tube size - Indicates the physical size of the tubing or exhaust port connections in the system, typically given in inches based on a sizing standard such as National Pipe Thread (NPT). Sizing is important, as an undersized tube line will result in high pressure drops, while an oversized line will be unnecessarily expensive to install.

== Materials ==
The materials used to construct the gas cabinet are an important part of proper system selection. The materials used for the casing and outer parts must have adequate structural strength, while the materials for the gas handling components must be compatible with the media, temperature requirements, and pressure ratings to prevent leakage, rupture, or contamination.

=== Aluminum ===
A light and fairly corrosion resistant metal which is most often anodized for increased corrosion and wear resistance. Aluminum is never used for tubing or fittings in modern industrial gas control & distribution systems since 316L stainless steel (optimum choice) is so available. Aluminum is not an ideal choice for purity. Aluminum in any form is never used for ultra pure industrial gas systems.

=== Copper ===
A soft, ductile metal with low hardness and excellent corrosion resistance. Copper is used commonly in tubes and pipes for its inertness and resistance to corrosion. Copper can be used for low air, oxygen and other inert non-critical gases such as medical CFOS systems. For ultra pure gasses 316L Stainless steel remains the optimum choice for many reasons.

=== Plastic ===
Any of numerous thermoplastic or thermosetting polymers of high molecular weight. Different grades (such as nylon, acetal, and polycarbonate) have varying properties, but most have strong chemical and corrosion resistance.

=== Steel ===
General purpose industrial metal with high physical strength and hardness. Steel is typically coated or finished to increase its corrosion resistance properties. Steel is used in the petroleum and petro-chemical industries.

=== Stainless steel ===
316L Stainless steel became industry standard for fittings, piping and controls in gas cabinets and distribution systems in the early 1980s. The material is further improved by electropolishing to render wetted surfaces extremely impervious to the most reactive gasses creating a non-shedding surface. A large industry has grown around supplying these ultra-specialized components and materials.

== See also ==
- Orbital welding
- Scrubber
- Bottled gas
- Pressure vessel
- Carbon fiber
- Composite overwrapped pressure vessel
- Filling Carousel
- Industrial gas
- Storage tank
- UN Recommendations on the Transport of Dangerous Goods
- Gas Cabinets Products
- Gas cabinets manufacturer
- Fuel container
