= Lende (disambiguation) =

Lende is an extinct genus of biarmosuchian from Malawi.

Lende may also refer to:

- Sijtje van der Lende (born 1950), Dutch speed skater
- Torkel Lende (1849–1909), Norwegian inventor

== See also ==
- Karen Lende O'Connor (born 1958), American equestrian
- Linde (surname)
