= Pressure swing adsorption =

Method of gases separation using selective adsorption under pressure

Schematic drawing of the PSA process ("aria" = air input). Note the symmetry in a vertical plane between the left and the right sketches.

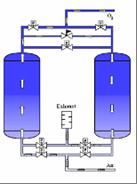
Nitrogen generator using PSA

Pressure swing adsorption (PSA) is a technique used to separate some gas species from a mixture of gases (typically air) under pressure according to the species' molecular characteristics and affinity for an adsorbent material. It operates at near-ambient temperature and significantly differs from the cryogenic distillation commonly used to separate gases. Selective adsorbent materials such as zeolites (molecular sieves), or activated carbon are used as trapping material, preferentially adsorbing the target gas species at high pressure. The process then swings to low pressure to desorb the adsorbed gas.

== Process ==
Animation of pressure swing adsorption, (1) and (2) showing alternating adsorption and desorption.: I / compressed air input / A / adsorption; O / oxygen output / D / desorption; E / exhaust

The pressure swing adsorption (PSA) process is based on the phenomenon that under high pressure, gases tend to be trapped onto solid surfaces, i.e. to be "adsorbed". The higher the pressure, the more gas is adsorbed. When the pressure is dropped, the gas is released, or desorbed. PSA can be used to separate gases in a mixture because different gases are adsorbed onto a given solid surface more or less strongly. For example, if a gas mixture such as air is passed under pressure through a vessel containing an adsorbent bed of zeolite that attracts nitrogen more strongly than oxygen, a fraction of nitrogen will stay in the bed, and the gas exiting the vessel will be richer in oxygen than the mixture entering. When the bed reaches the limit of its capacity to adsorb nitrogen, it can be regenerated by decreasing the pressure, thus releasing the adsorbed nitrogen. It is then ready for another cycle of producing oxygen-enriched air.

Using two adsorbent vessels allows for near-continuous production of the target gas. It also allows a pressure equalisation, where the gas leaving the vessel being depressurised is used to partially pressurise the second vessel. This results in significant energy savings, and is a common industrial practice.

== Adsorbents ==
Aside from their ability to discriminate between different gases, adsorbents for PSA systems are usually very porous materials chosen because of their large specific surface areas. Typical adsorbents are zeolite, activated carbon, silica gel, alumina, or synthetic resins. Though the gas adsorbed on these surfaces may consist of a layer only one or at most a few molecules thickness, surface areas of several hundred square meters per gram enable the adsorption of a large portion of the adsorbent's weight in gas. In addition to their affinity for different gases, zeolites and some types of activated carbon may use their molecular sieve characteristics to exclude some gas molecules from their structure based on the size and shape of the molecules, thereby restricting the ability of the larger molecules to be adsorbed.

== Applications ==
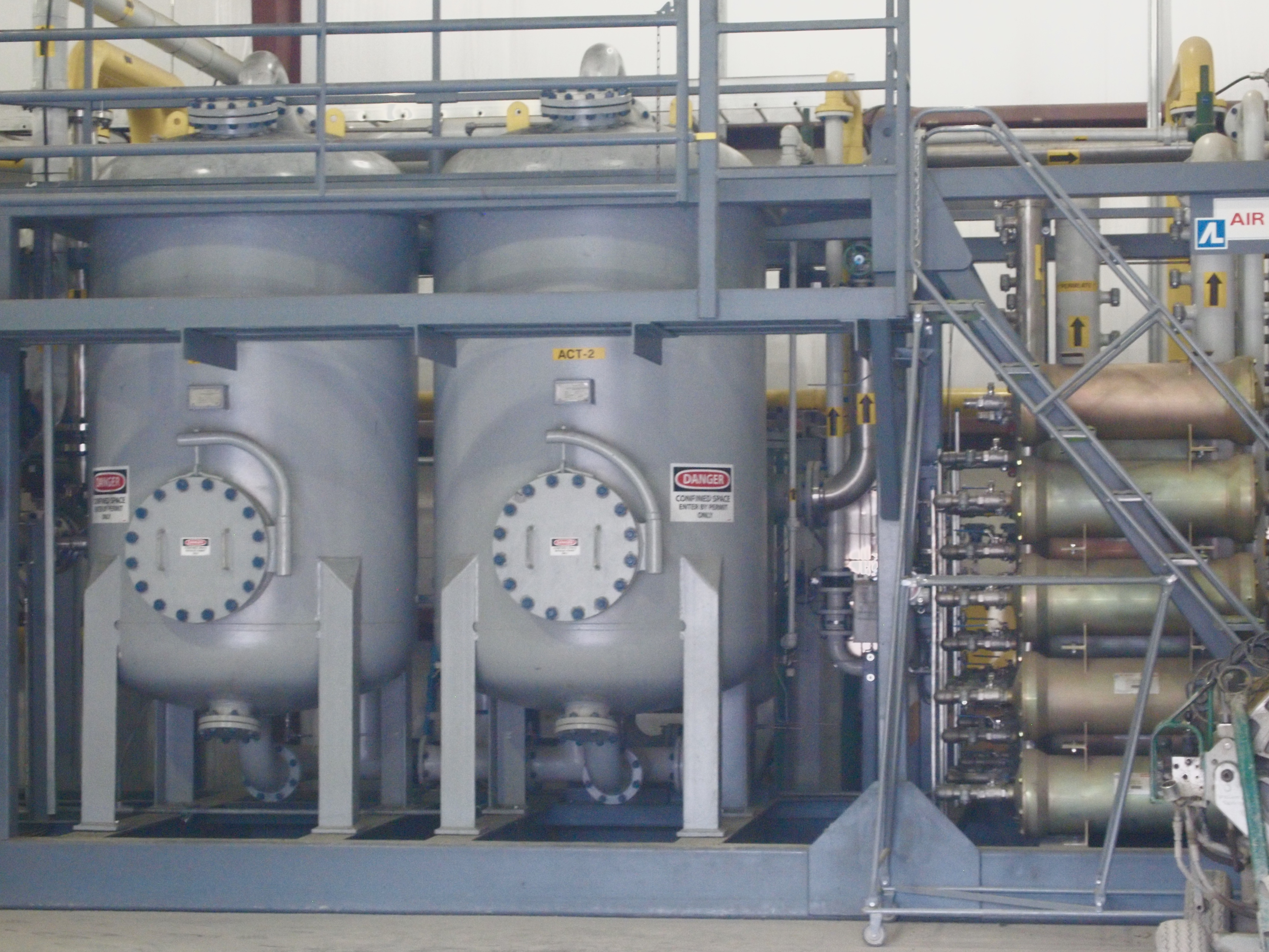
Gas separator membrane skid used in landfill gas utilization process

=== Distribution process for oxygen produced by PSA plants ===
Aside from its use to supply medical oxygen, or as a substitute for bulk cryogenic or compressed-cylinder storage, which is the primary oxygen source for any hospital, PSA has numerous other uses. One of the primary applications of PSA is in the removal of carbon dioxide (CO_{2}) as the final step in the large-scale commercial synthesis of hydrogen (H_{2}) for use in oil refineries and in the production of ammonia (NH_{3}). Refineries often use PSA technology in the removal of hydrogen sulfide (H_{2}S) from hydrogen feed and recycle streams of hydrotreating and hydrocracking units. Another application of PSA is the separation of carbon dioxide from biogas to increase the methane (CH_{4}) ratio.

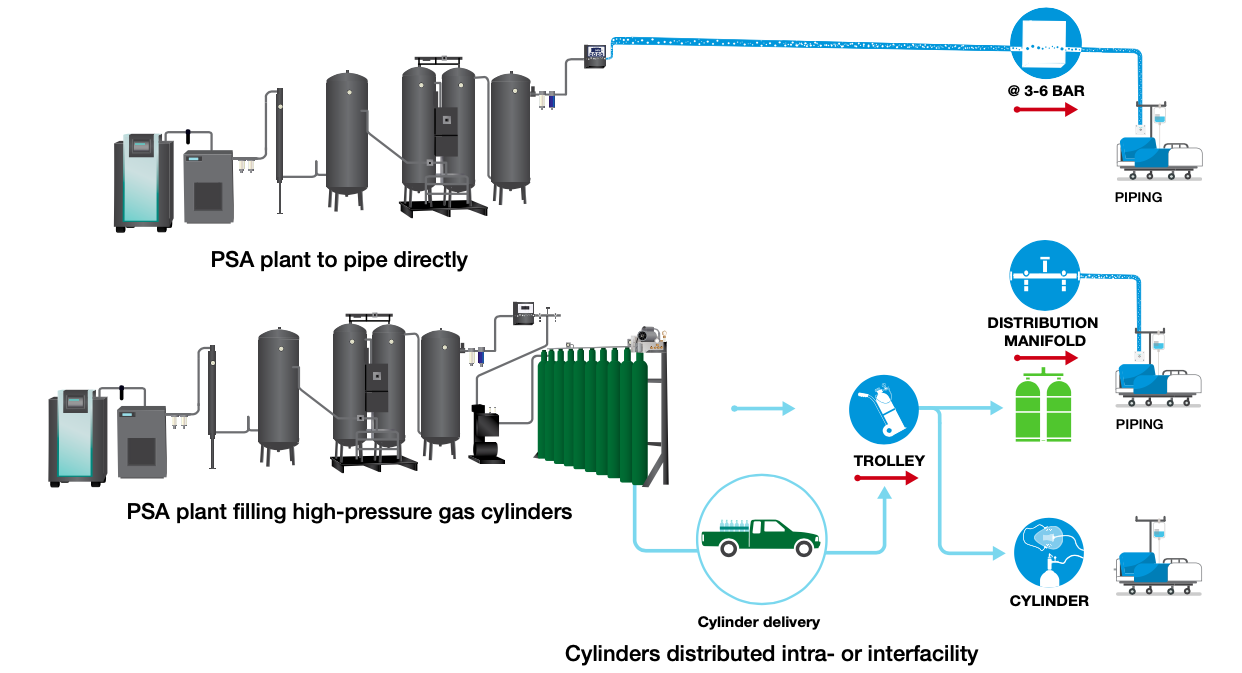
Distribution of oxygen produced by a primary line coming from a PSA plant

Through PSA the biogas can be upgraded to a quality similar to natural gas. This includes a process in landfill gas utilization to upgrade landfill gas to utility-grade high purity methane gas to be sold as natural gas.

PSA is also used in:

- Hypoxic air fire prevention systems to produce air with a low oxygen content.
- On purpose propylene plants via propane dehydrogenation. They consist of a selective medium for the preferred adsorption of methane and ethane over hydrogen.
- Industrial nitrogen generator units based on the PSA process can produce high-purity nitrogen gas (up to 99.9995%) from compressed air. However, such generators are more suited to supply intermediate ranges of purity and flows.
  - Nitrogen: from 100 normal cubic meters per hour (Nm^{3}/h) at 99.9% purity, to 9,000 Nm^{3}/h at 97% purity.
  - Oxygen: up to 1,500 Nm^{3}/h with a purity between 88% and 93%.

For carbon capture and storage (CCS), research is currently underway to capture CO_{2} in large quantities from coal-fired power plants prior to geosequestration, in order to reduce greenhouse gas production from these plants.

PSA has also been discussed as a future alternative to the non-regenerable sorbent technology used in space suit primary life support systems, in order to save weight and to extend the operating time of the suit.

PSA is used in medical oxygen concentrators used by emphysema and COVID-19 patients and others requiring oxygen-enriched air for breathing.

== Variations of PSA technology ==
=== Double Stage PSA ===
Double stage PSA (DS-PSA), sometimes also referred to as dual step PSA, was developed for use in laboratory nitrogen generators. Nitrogen gas is produced into two steps: in the first step, the compressed air is forced to pass through a carbon molecular sieve to produce nitrogen at a purity of approximately 98%; in the second step this nitrogen is forced to pass into a second carbon molecular sieve and the nitrogen gas reaches a final purity up to 99.999%. The purge gas from the second step is recycled and partially used as feed gas in the first step.

In addition, the purge process is supported by active evacuation for better performance in the next cycle. The goal of both of these changes is to improve efficiency over a conventional PSA process.

DS-PSA can also be applied to increase the oxygen concentration. In this case, an aluminum silica based zeolite adsorbs nitrogen in the first stage reaching 95% oxygen in the outlet, and in the second stage a carbon-based molecular sieve adsorbs the residual nitrogen in a reverse cycle, concentrating oxygen up to 99%.

=== Rapid PSA ===
Rapid pressure swing adsorption, or RPSA, is frequently used in portable oxygen concentrators. It allows a large reduction in the size of the adsorbent bed when high purity is not essential and when the feed gas (air) can be discarded. It works by quickly cycling the pressure while alternately venting opposite ends of the column at the same rate. This means that non-adsorbed gases progress along the column much faster and are vented at the distal end, while adsorbed gases do not get the chance to progress and are vented at the proximal extremity.

=== Vacuum swing adsorption ===
Vacuum swing adsorption (VSA) segregates certain gases from a gaseous mixture at near ambient pressure; the process then swings to a vacuum to regenerate the adsorbent material. VSA differs from other PSA techniques because it operates at near-ambient temperatures and pressures. VSA typically draws the gas through the separation process with a vacuum. For oxygen and nitrogen VSA systems, the vacuum is typically generated by a blower. Hybrid vacuum pressure swing adsorption (VPSA) systems also exist. VPSA systems apply pressurized gas to the separation process and also apply a vacuum to the purge gas. VPSA systems, like one of the portable oxygen concentrators, are among the most efficient systems measured on customary industry indices, such as recovery (product gas out/product gas in) and productivity (product gas out/mass of sieve material). Generally, higher recovery leads to a smaller compressor, blower, or other compressed gas or vacuum source and lower power consumption. Higher productivity leads to smaller sieve beds. The consumer will most likely consider indices which have a more directly measurable difference in the overall system, like the amount of product gas divided by the system weight and size, the system initial and maintenance costs, the system power consumption or other operational costs, and reliability.

== See also ==
- Adsorption – Phenomenon of surface adhesion
- Compressed air dryer – Filter systems to reduce humidity of compressed air
- Gas separation – Techniques to provide multiple products or purify a product
- Hydrogen pinch – Petrochemical process optimization method
- Hydrogen purifier – Technology for purifying hydrogen
- Hypoxicator – Device for providing breathing air with reduced oxygen content
- Industrial gas – Gaseous materials produced for use in industry
- Oxygen concentrator – Device that removes nitrogen from air
- Pervaporation – Industrial liquid purification method
