= Hypoxic air technology for fire prevention =

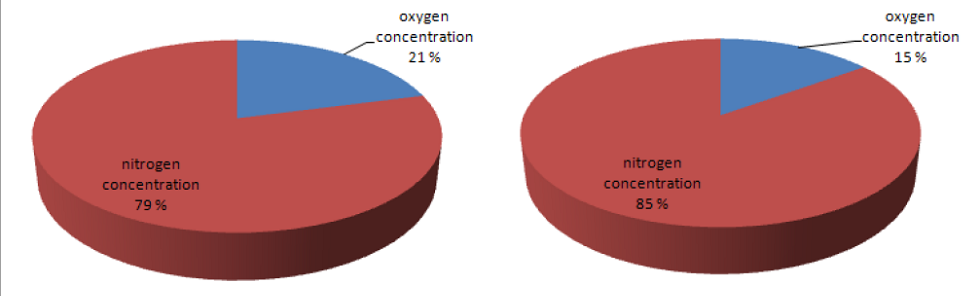
Composition of normal air vs. hypoxic air

Hypoxic air technology for fire prevention, also known as oxygen reduction system (ORS), is an active fire protection technique based on a permanent reduction of the oxygen concentration in the protected rooms. Unlike traditional fire suppression systems that usually extinguish fire after it is detected, hypoxic air is able to prevent fire.

== Description ==
In a volume protected by hypoxic air, a normobaric hypoxic atmosphere is continuously retained: hypoxic means that the partial pressure of the oxygen is lower than at the sea level, normobaric means that the barometric pressure is equal to the barometric pressure at the sea level. Usually 1/4 to 1/2 of the oxygen contained in the air (that is, 5 to 10% of the air) is replaced by the same amount of nitrogen: as a consequence a hypoxic atmosphere containing around 15 Vol% of oxygen and 85 Vol% of nitrogen is created. In a normobaric hypoxic environment, common materials cannot ignite or burn when exposed to a localized small scale ignition source. A reduction of the oxygen level to 15% does not achieve conditions where a fire cannot occur or is extinguished. However, it reduces the probability of a fire occurring by increasing the ignition energy needed, and there are also indications of increased ignition times.

== Design and operation ==
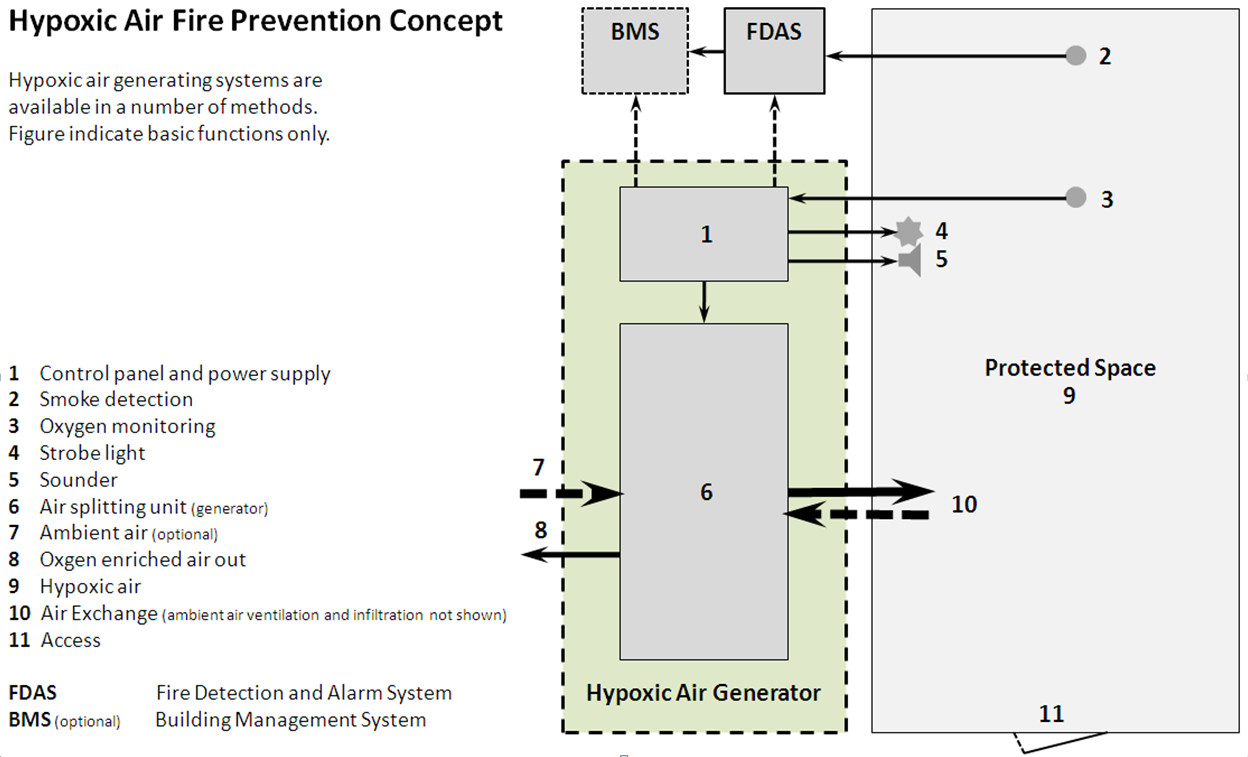
Hypoxic Air Fire Prevention system - Concept

Air with a reduced oxygen content is injected to the protected volumes to lower the oxygen concentration until the desired oxygen concentration is reached. Then, because of air infiltration, the oxygen concentration inside the protected volumes rises: when it exceeds a certain threshold, low-oxygen air is again injected to the protected volumes until the desired oxygen concentration is reached. Oxygen sensors are installed in the protected volumes to continuously monitor the oxygen concentration.

The exact oxygen level to retain in the protected volumes is determined after a careful assessment of materials, configurations, and hazards. Tables list ignition-limiting oxygen thresholds for some materials. Alternatively, the ignition-limiting threshold is determined by performing a proper ignition test described in BSI PAS 95:2011 Hypoxic air fire prevention systems specification.

Smoke detectors are installed in protected volumes because, similar to gas suppression systems, hypoxic air does not prevent smoldering and pyrolyzing processes.

Air with low oxygen concentration is produced by hypoxic air generators, also known as air splitting units. There are three different types of hypoxic air generators: membrane-based, PSA-based, and VSA-based. VSA-based hypoxic air generators usually have a lower energy consumption compared to PSA-based and membrane-based generators. Hypoxic air generators can be located inside or outside the protected rooms. Hypoxic air systems can be integrated with the building management system and can include systems to recover the heat generated by the hypoxic air generator that, would otherwise be wasted.

Air with low oxygen concentration is transported to the protected volumes through dedicated pipes or, more simply, via an existing ventilation system. In the latter case, dedicated pipes or ducts are not required.

== Applications ==
The benefits of preventing a fire instead of suppressing it makes hypoxic air suitable for applications where a fire would cause unacceptable damage. Unlike traditional fire-suppression systems, dedicated pipes or nozzles are not required.

Hypoxic air for fire prevention are used in:

- Data centers / ICT facilities
- Storage of high value items
- Archives
- Freezer and cold storage
- Large warehouses
- Paper mills
- Heritage applications
- Telecom
- Electrical substation
- Utilities
- Document storage
- High-bay warehouses

The reduction of artifact degradation and food deterioration is a plus for applications like food warehouses, storage and archives.

=== Other uses of hypoxic air ===
Hypoxic air fire prevention systems can also be used for purposes other than fire prevention, for example:

- High altitude training
- Health
- Preserving artifacts and objects from degradation or oxidation
- Preserving food from deterioration, commonly known as modified atmosphere packaging.

Combining fire prevention, indoor climate and reduction of artefacts/food degradation is a completely new approach for a fire safety system.

== Effects on health ==
Fire-prevention systems which result in the oxygen content being less than 19.5% are not permitted for occupied spaces without providing employees supplemental respirators by federal regulation (OSHA) in the United States.

However, hypoxic air is considered by some to be safe to breathe for most people. Medical studies have been undertaken on this topic. Angerer and Novak's conclusion is that "working environments with low oxygen concentrations to a minimum of 13% and normal barometric pressure do not impose a health hazard, provided that precautions are observed, comprising medical examinations and limitation of exposure time." Küpper et al. say that oxygen concentration between 17.0 and 14.8% does not cause any risk for healthy people by hypoxia. It also does not cause risks for people with chronic diseases of moderate severity. The ability for strenuous work is reduced as the concentration decreases with the time that exertion can be sustained becoming very low below these levels, below around 17% it may be necessary to take breaks outside the environment if more than 6 hours is to be spent inside, especially if any physical exertion is performed.

Pressurized aircraft cabins are typically maintained at 75 kPa, the pressure found at 2,500 m (8,200 ft) altitude, resulting in an oxygen partial pressure of about 16 kPa, which is the same as a 15% oxygen concentration in a hypoxic-air application at sea-level pressure. However, passengers are sedentary and crew members have immediate access to supplemental oxygen.

Hypoxic air is to be considered clean air and not contaminated air when assessing oxygen depletion hazards.

Information relating access to the protected areas i.e. oxygen-reduced atmosphere are illustrated:

- AI, Arbeitsinspektorat;
- SUVA, Schweizerische Unfallversicherungsanstalt;
- DGUV, Deutsche Gesetzliche Unfallversicherung;
- UIAA, Medical commission of Union Internationale Des Associations D’Alpinisme.

== Applicable standards and guidelines, system verification ==
- UL 67377 Oxygen Reduction Fire Prevention System Units
- BSI PAS 95:2011 - Hypoxic air fire prevention systems. Specification
- VdS 3527en:2007 - Inerting and Oxygen Reduction Systems, Planning and Installation
- Austrian Standards International
  - ÖNORM F 3073: Planning, engineering, assembly, commissioning and servicing of oxygen reduction systems
  - ÖNORM F 3007: Oxygen reduction system
  - ÖNORM F 3008: Oxygen reduction system - CIE UNIT control unit
- TRVB S 155: Engineering, installation and operation requirements for oxygen reduction systems using nitrogen in buildings from a fire prevention technology standpoint
- EN 16750:2017 Fixed firefighting systems — Oxygen reduction systems — Design, installation, planning and maintenance
- ISO 20338:2019 Oxygen reduction systems for fire prevention — Design, installation, planning and maintenance

Inspection body accreditation criteria are established according to ISO/IEC 17010 for third party verification of hypoxic air fire prevention system conformance to BSI PAS 95:2011 and VdS 3527en:2007.

== See also ==
- Inerting system
