= Jorge Gascon =

Researcher

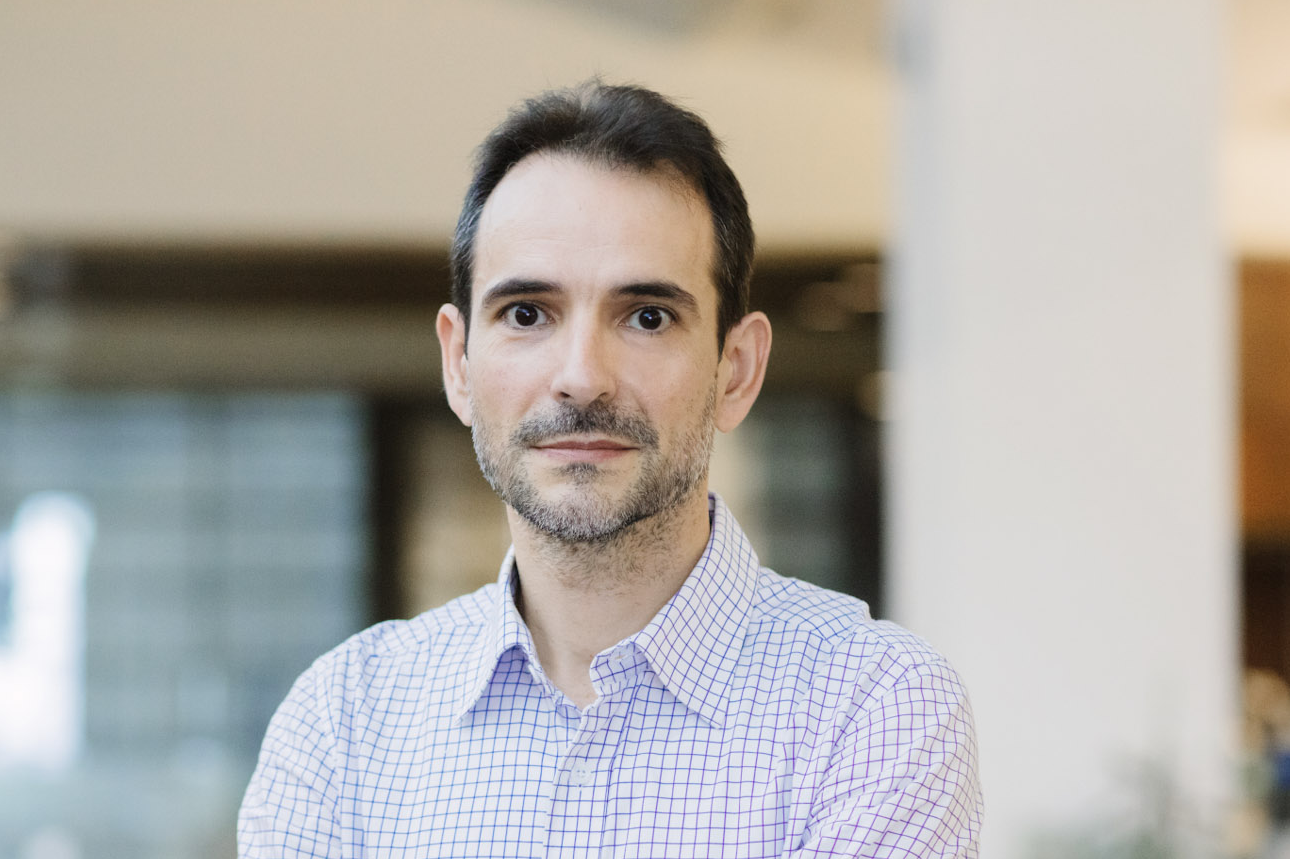
Professor Jorge Gascon

Jorge Gascon (born December 1, 1977) is a professor of chemical engineering at King Abdullah University of Science and Technology, director of the KAUST Catalysis Center, and a group leader of the Advanced Catalytic Materials group.

== Biography ==
He received his MSc. in industrial chemistry in 2002 and his PhD, cum laude, in chemical engineering in 2006, both at the University of Zaragoza. The topic of his PhD thesis was "Two zone fluidized bed reactors for hydrocarbon valorization."

Then he moved to Netherlands, where he was a post doctoral student (2006–2009), assistant professor (2010–2012), associate professor (2012–2014) and Antoni van Leeuwenhoek Professor (2014–2017) of Catalysis Engineering at Delft University of Technology.

In 2017, he moved to Saudi Arabia, where he is working as a professor and Director of Catalysis Center at KAUST.

His research interests fall at the interphase of Chemical Engineering and Materials Science, including the development and demonstration of new nano-structured materials and composites tackling the problems of global warming and renewable energy resources. He is particularly interested in application of porous materials, such as Metal Organic Frameworks, Covalent Organic Frameworks and zeolites. Applications comprise membrane and adsorbent development, multifunctional catalysis, Fischer Tropsch Synthesis, methanol to olefins, photo- and electro-catalysis.

He is also a member of editorial board of the Chemical Engineering Journal and editorial advisory board of ACS Catalysis Journal.

== Awards and honors ==
Gascon is a member of the board of the International Zeolite Association Commission on Metal–organic framework. He has been the recipient of the prestigious VENI (2010), VIDI (2013) and ERC Starting (2013) personal grants and of the 2013 ExxonMobil Chemical European Science and Engineering Award.

He has co-authored more than 300 publications in peer-reviewed journals, several book chapters, patents and has edited the book 'Metal Organic Frameworks as Heterogeneous Catalysts'.

Gascon has been recognized as a highly cited researcher by Web of Science having the current h-index of 86.

He is in the list of highly cited researchers 2019, 2020, 2021. Demonstrated by the production of multiple highly cited papers that rank in the top 1% by citations for field and year in Web of Science.

Gascon was named Doctor Honoris Causa by La Universidad de Alicante in 2021.

== Most influential publications ==
1. Metal–organic framework nanosheets in polymer composite materials for gas separation
2. An Amine-Functionalized MIL-53 Metal−Organic Framework with Large Separation Power for CO_{2} and CH_{4}
3. Solution processable metal–organic frameworks for mixed matrix membranes using porous liquids
4. Structure–performance descriptors and the role of Lewis acidity in the methanol-to-propylene process
5. Evidence for a chemical clock in oscillatory formation of UiO-66
6. Metal organic framework-mediated synthesis of highly active and stable Fischer-Tropsch catalysts
