= Linde (surname) =

Linde is a surname. Notable people with the surname include:

- Andrei Linde, Russian physicist
- Ann Linde (born 1961), Swedish politician and repeatedly minister
- Bo Linde, Swedish composer
- Carl von Linde, German engineer
- Dennis Linde, American songwriter
- Edward Linde-Lubaszenko (1939–2026), Polish actor
- Elmarie Linde, South African politician
- George Linde, South African cricketer
- Hans A. Linde, American justice from Oregon
- Hans-Martin Linde, flute and recorder player
- Iluta Linde (born 1972), Latvian curler
- Johan Linde, Australian boxer
- Klaus Linde, German alternative medicine researcher
- Leif Linde (born 1955), Swedish politician
- Marie Linde (1894–1963), South African author
- Peter Linde, Swedish sculptor
- Samuel Linde (1771–1847), German-Polish lexicographer
- Steve Linde (born 1960), newspaperman

== See also ==
- Lende
