= Cryogenic gas plant =

Industrial facility that creates cryogenic liquid at relatively high purity

A cryogenic gas plant is an industrial facility that creates molecular oxygen, molecular nitrogen, argon, krypton, helium, and xenon at relatively high purity. As air is made up of nitrogen, the most common gas in the atmosphere, at 78%, with oxygen at 19%, and argon at 1%, with trace gasses making up the rest, cryogenic gas plants separate air inside a distillation column at cryogenic temperatures (about 100 K/-173 °C) to produce high purity gases such as argon, nitrogen, oxygen, and many more with 1 ppm or less impurities. The process is based on the general theory of the Hampson-Linde cycle of air separation, which was invented by Carl von Linde in 1895.

Composition of Earth's atmosphere by volume.

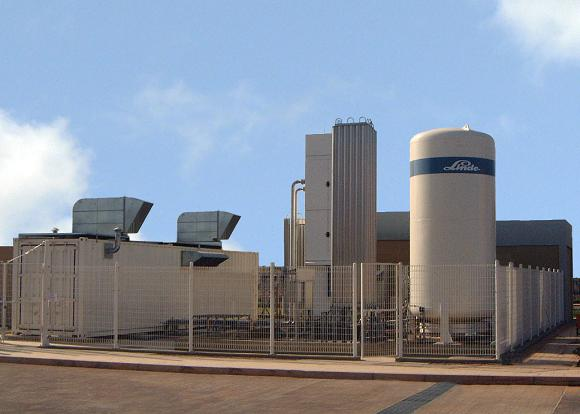
Liquid Oxygen plant with production rate of 80 Nm^{3}/hour

== Purpose ==
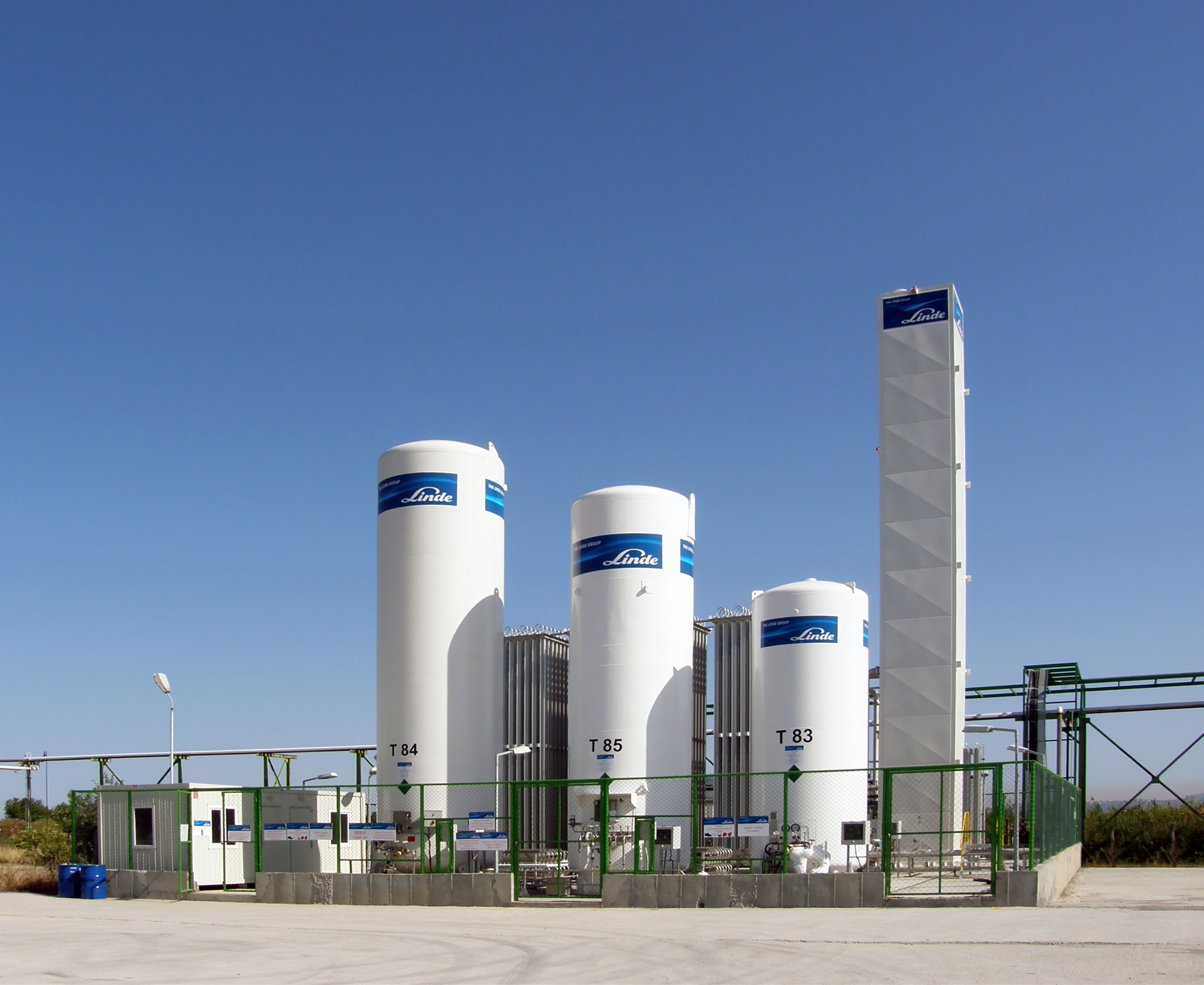
Gaseous Nitrogen (GAN) plant with production rate of 800 Nm^{3}/hour

The main purpose of a cryogenic nitrogen plant is to provide a customer with high purity gaseous nitrogen (GAN), liquid nitrogen (LIN), liquid argon (LAR) and high purity argon PLAR at high purities, along with extracting trace gasses like krypton, xenon and helium. High purity liquid material such as oxygen or nitrogen produced by cryogenic plants is stored in a local tank and used as a strategic reserve. This liquid can be vaporised to cover peaks in demand or for use when the plant is offline. Argon, xenon and helium are usually sold to customers in high pressure tank cars or trucks directly due to the smaller volumes. Typical cryogenic nitrogen plants range from 200ft^{3}/hour to very large range plants with a daily capacity of 63 tonnes of nitrogen a day (as the Cantarell Field plant in Mexico).

The cryogenic air separation achieves high purity oxygen of more than 99.5%. The resulting high purity product can be stored as a liquid and/or filled into cylinders. These cylinders can even be distributed to customer in the medical sector, welding or mixed with other gases and used as breathing gas for diving. The plant also produces nitrogen which is used for ammonia production for the fertilizer industry, float glass manufacturing, petrochemical usage, Purge gas, amine gas treatment, Bearing seal gas, and polyester manufacturing.

The resulting argon gas can be used in semiconductor manufacturing and photovoltaic manufacturing.

== Plant modules ==
A cryogenic plant is composed of the following elements:

=== Warm end (W/E) container ===
- Compressor
- Air receiver
- Chiller (Heat exchanger)
- Pre-filter
- Air purification unit (APU)

=== Coldbox ===
- Main heat exchanger
- Boiler
- Distillation column
- Expansion brake turbine

=== Storage ===
- Liquid oxygen tank
- Vapouriser
- Filling station

== How the plant works ==
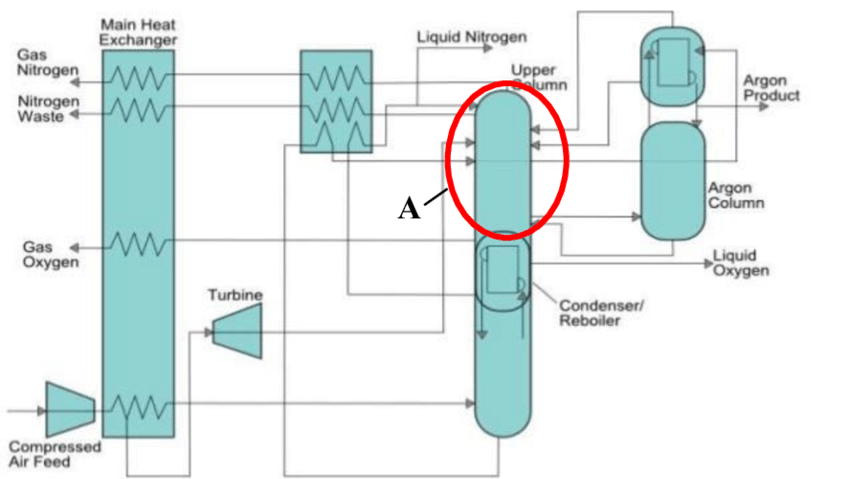
Diagram of a Cryogenic Air Separation Unit

=== Warm end process ===
Atmospheric air is roughly filtered and pressurised by a compressor, which provides the product pressure to deliver to the customer. The amount of air sucked in depends on the customer’s oxygen demand.

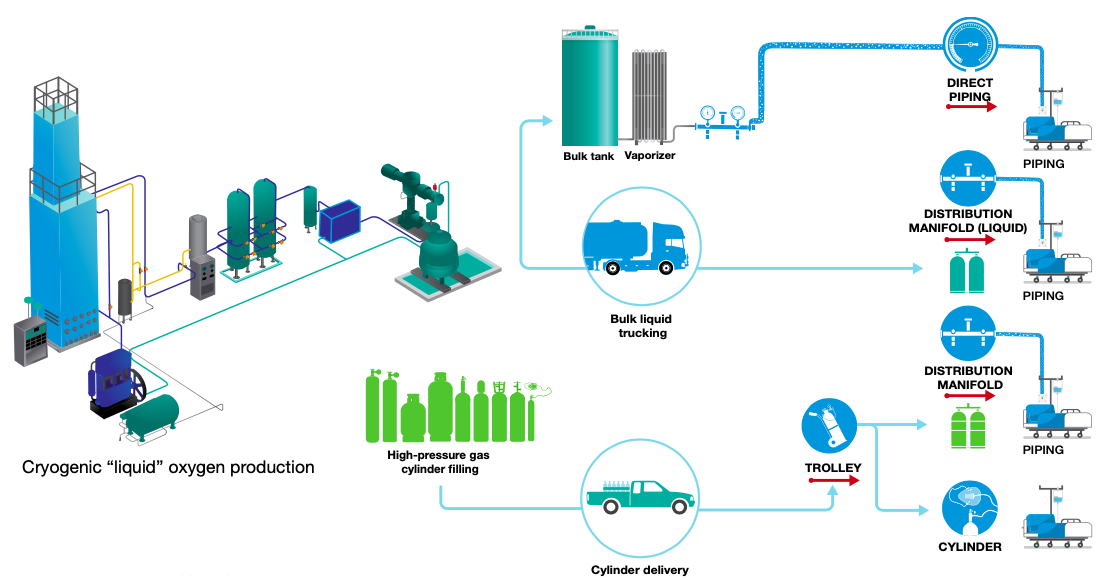
Distribution of Cryogenically Produced Oxygen (Liquid and Gas)

The air receiver collects condensate and minimises pressure drop. The dry and compressed air leaves the air to refrigerant heat exchanger with about 10°C.

To clean the process air further, there are different stages of filtration. First of all, more condensate is removed, then a coalescing filter acts as a gravity filter and finally an adsorber filled with activated carbon removes some hydrocarbons.

The last unit process in the warm end container is the thermal swing adsorber (TSA). The Air purification unit cleans the compressed process air by removing any residual water vapour, carbon dioxide and hydrocarbons. It comprises two vessels, valves and exhaust to allow the changeover of vessels. While one of the TSA beds is on stream the second one is regenerated by the waste gas flow, which is vented through a silencer into the ambient environment.

=== Coldbox process ===
The process air enters the main heat exchanger in the coldbox where it is cooled in counter flow with the waste gas stream. After leaving the main heat exchanger the process air has a temperature of about –112°C and is partly liquefied. The complete liquefaction is achieved through evaporation of cooled liquid oxygen in the boiler. After passing a purity control valve, process air enters on top of the distillation column and flows down through the packing material.

The stream of evaporated oxygen vapour in the shell of the boiler vents back into the distillation column. It rises through the column packing material and encounters the descending stream of liquid process air.

The liquid air descending down the column loses nitrogen. It becomes richer in oxygen and collects at the base of the column as pure liquid oxygen. It flows out into the boiler to the cold box liquid product valve. An on-line oxygen analyzer controls the opening of the liquid product valve to transfer pure low-pressure liquid oxygen into the storage tank.

The rising oxygen vapour becomes rich in nitrogen and argon. It leaves the column and exits the cold box at ambient temperature through the main heat exchanger as a waste gas. This waste gas provides purge gas to regenerate the TSA unit and to the cool the refrigeration turbine.

Turbines located at the base of the cold box provide refrigeration for the process. A stream of high-pressure gas from the main heat exchangers is cooled and expanded to low pressure in the turbine. This cold air returns to the waste stream of the heat exchanger to inject refrigeration. Energy removed by the turbine re-appears as heat in the turbine’s closed-cycle air-brake circuit. This heat is removed in an air-to-air cooler by waste gas from the cold box.

=== Storage and vaporising process ===
Liquid from the tank is compressed to high pressure in a cryogenic liquid pump. It is then vaporised in an ambient air evaporator to produce gaseous oxygen or nitrogen. The high-pressure gas then can pass into cylinders via the gas manifold or fed into a customer's product pipeline.

== Applications ==
=== Applications for high purity oxygen ===
- Furnace enrichment
- Medical gases
- Metal production
- Welding
- Rocket propellant oxidizer

=== Applications for high purity nitrogen production ===
- Ammonia production for the fertilizer industry
- Float glass manufacturing
- Petrochemical
- Purge gas
- Blanketing/Inerting gas for tanks and reactor vessels
- Amine gas treatment
- Bearing seal gas
- Polyester manufacturing

=== Applications for high purity argon ===
- Semiconductor manufacturing
- Photovoltaic manufacturing
- Shielding gas in MIG or TIG welding

=== Applications for xenon ===
- Space Travel
- Medical Scan
- Flash tube lamps and filler gas in some types of incandescent lightbulb

== See also ==
- Air separation
- Cryogenics
- Industrial gas
- Liquefaction of gases
- Liquid air
- Liquid oxygen
- Liquid nitrogen
