= Gas separation =

Techniques to provide multiple products or purify a product

Gas separation can refer to any of a number of techniques used to separate gases, either to give multiple products or to purify a single product.

== Swing adsorption techniques ==
=== Pressure swing adsorption ===
Pressure swing adsorption (PSA) pressurizes and depressurizes a multicomponent gas around an adsorbent medium to selectively adsorb some components of a gas while leaving other components free-flowing.

=== Vacuum swing adsorption ===
Vacuum swing adsorption (VSA) uses the same principle as PSA but swings between vacuum pressures and atmospheric pressure. PSA and VSA techniques may be combined and are called "vacuum pressure swing adsorption" (VPSA) in this case.

=== Temperature swing adsorption ===
Temperature swing adsorption (TSA) is similar to other swing adsorption techniques but cycles the temperature of the adsorbent bed-gas system instead of the gas pressure to achieve separation.

== Cryogenic distillation ==
Cryogenic distillation is typically only used for very high volumes because of its nonlinear cost-scale relationship, which makes the process more economical at larger scales. Because of this it is typically only used for air separation.

== See also ==
- Oxygen concentrator – Device that removes nitrogen from air
- Nitrogen generator – Air-to-nitrogen production complexes
- Industrial gas – Gaseous materials produced for use in industry
- Air separation – Chemical process
- Natural-gas processing – Industrial processes designed to purify raw natural gas
- Solid sorbents for carbon capture – Materials that absorb carbon dioxide
