= Oxygen concentrator =

Device that removes nitrogen from air

An oxygen concentrator is a device that concentrates the oxygen from a gas supply (typically ambient air) by selectively removing nitrogen to supply an oxygen-enriched product gas stream. They are used in industry, to provide supplemental oxygen at high altitudes, and as medical devices for oxygen therapy.

Oxygen concentrators are widely used for oxygen provision in healthcare applications, especially where liquid or pressurized oxygen is too dangerous or inconvenient, such as in homes or portable clinics, and can also provide an economical source of oxygen in industrial processes, where they are also known as oxygen gas generators or oxygen generation plants. Two methods in common use are pressure swing adsorption and membrane gas separation.

Pressure swing adsorption (PSA) oxygen concentrators use a molecular sieve to adsorb gases and operate on the principle of rapid pressure swing adsorption of atmospheric nitrogen onto zeolite minerals at high pressure. This type of adsorption system functions as a nitrogen scrubber, allowing other atmospheric gases to pass through and leaving oxygen as the primary remaining gas. PSA technology is a reliable and economical technique for small to mid-scale oxygen generation. Cryogenic separation is more suitable at higher volumes.

Gas separation across a membrane is a pressure-driven process, where the driving force is the difference in pressure between the inlet of the raw material and the outlet of the product. The membrane used in the process is generally non-porous, minimizing gas leakage through the membrane. The performance of the membrane depends on permeability and selectivity. Permeability is affected by the penetrant size. Larger gas molecules have a lower diffusion coefficient. The membrane gas separation equipment typically pumps gas into the membrane module and the targeted gases are separated based on the difference in diffusivity and solubility. For example, oxygen will be separated from the ambient air and collected at the upstream side, and nitrogen at the downstream side. As of 2016, membrane technology was reported as capable of producing 10 to 25 tonnes of 25 to 40% oxygen per day.

== History ==
Home medical oxygen concentrators were invented in the early 1970s, with the manufacturing output of these devices increasing in the late 1970s. Union Carbide Corporation and Bendix Corporation were both early manufacturers. Before that era, home medical oxygen therapy required the use of heavy high-pressure oxygen cylinders or small cryogenic liquid oxygen systems. Both of these delivery systems required frequent home visits by suppliers to replenish oxygen supplies. In the United States, Medicare switched from fee-for-service payment to a flat monthly rate for home oxygen therapy in the mid-1980s, causing the durable medical equipment (DME) industry to rapidly embrace concentrators as a way to control costs. This reimbursement change dramatically decreased the number of primary high pressure and liquid oxygen delivery systems in use in homes in the United States at that time. Oxygen concentrators became the preferred and most common means of delivering home oxygen. The number of manufacturers entering the oxygen concentrator market increased significantly as a result of this change. Union Carbide Corporation invented the molecular sieve in the 1950s, which made these devices possible. It also invented the first cryogenic liquid home medical oxygen systems in the 1960s.

== How oxygen concentrators work ==
Oxygen concentrators using pressure swing adsorption (PSA) technology are used widely for oxygen provision in healthcare applications, especially where liquid or pressurized oxygen is too dangerous or inconvenient, such as in homes or portable clinics. For other purposes, there are also concentrators based on nitrogen separation membrane technology.

Most home oxygen concentrators draw in surrounding air and use zeolite molecular sieves to separate nitrogen, producing an oxygen-enriched gas stream. An oxygen concentrator removes nitrogen from ambient air, leaving an oxygen-enriched gas for use by people requiring medical oxygen due to low oxygen levels in their blood. Oxygen concentrators provide an economical source of oxygen in industrial processes, where they are also known as oxygen gas generators or oxygen generation plants.

=== Pressure swing adsorption ===
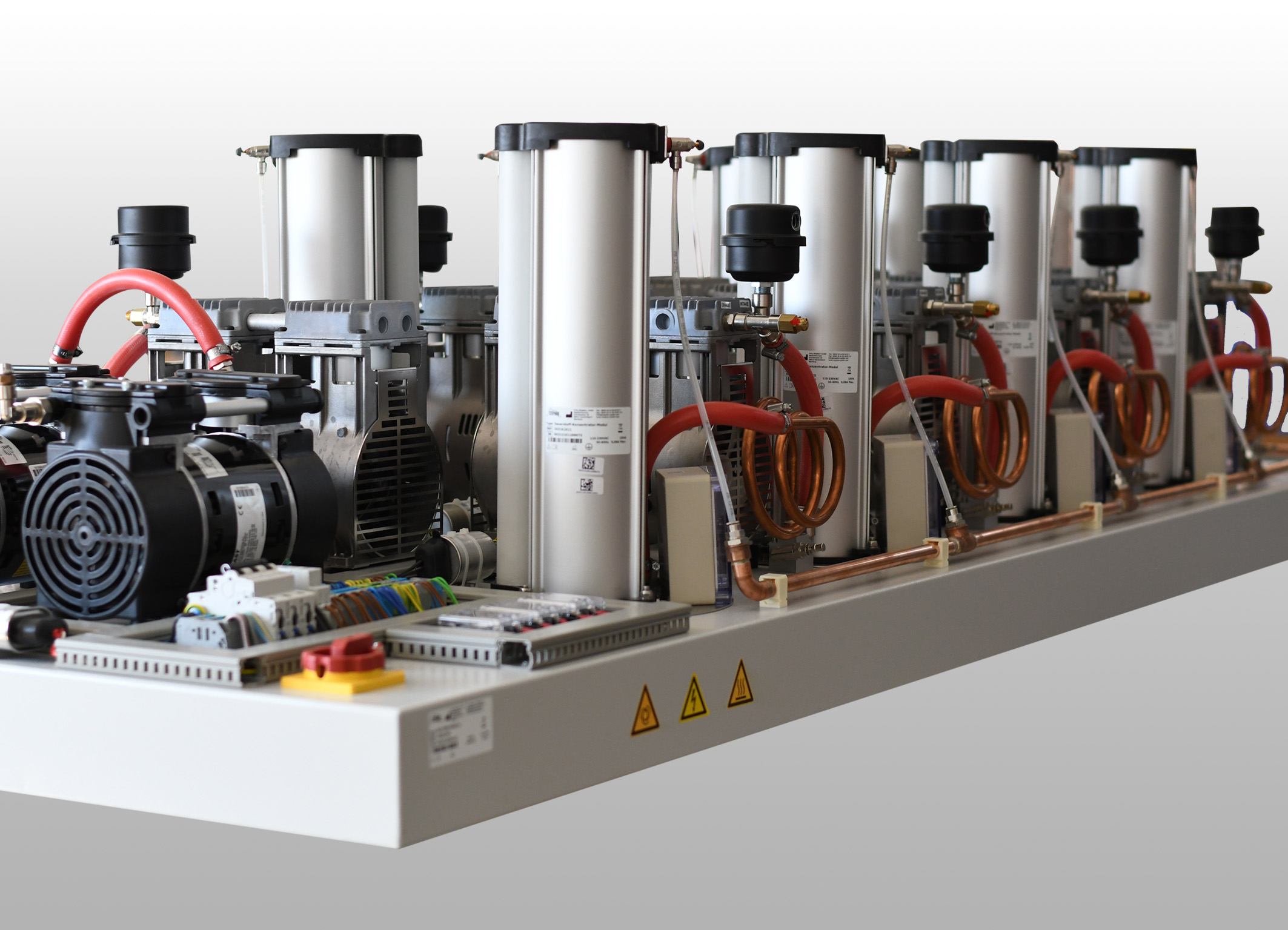
Modern Fritz Stephan GmbH multi-molecular sieve oxygen concentrator.

These oxygen concentrators utilize a molecular sieve to adsorb gases and operate on the principle of rapid pressure swing adsorption of atmospheric nitrogen onto zeolite minerals at high pressure. This adsorption system therefore functions as a nitrogen scrubber, allowing other atmospheric gases to pass through and leaving oxygen as the primary remaining gas. PSA technology is a reliable and economical technique for small- to mid-scale oxygen generation. Cryogenic separation is more suitable at higher volumes, and external delivery is generally more suitable for small volumes.

At high pressure, the porous zeolite adsorbs large quantities of nitrogen because of its large surface area and chemical characteristics. The oxygen concentrator compresses air and passes it over zeolite, causing the zeolite to adsorb the nitrogen from the air. It then collects the remaining gas, which is mostly oxygen, and the nitrogen desorbs from the zeolite under the reduced pressure to be vented.

Animation of pressure swing adsorption (1) and (2), showing alternating adsorption and desorption.: I / compressed air input / A / adsorption; O / oxygen output / D / desorption; E / exhaust

An oxygen concentrator has an air compressor, two cylinders filled with zeolite pellets, a pressure-equalizing reservoir, and some valves and tubes. In the first half-cycle, which lasts about 3 seconds, the first cylinder receives air from the compressor. During that time, the pressure in the first cylinder rises from atmospheric to about 2.5 times normal atmospheric pressure (typically 20 psi/138 kPa gauge, or 2.36 atmospheres absolute) and the zeolite becomes saturated with nitrogen. As the first cylinder reaches near pure oxygen (there are small amounts of argon, CO_{2}, water vapour, and other minor atmospheric components) in the first half-cycle, a valve opens and the oxygen-enriched gas flows to the pressure-equalizing reservoir, which connects to the patient's oxygen hose. At the end of the first half of the cycle, there is another valve position change so that the air from the compressor is directed to the second cylinder. The pressure in the first cylinder drops as the enriched oxygen moves into the reservoir, allowing the nitrogen to be desorbed back into gas. Partway through the second half of the cycle, there is another valve position change to vent the gas in the first cylinder back into the ambient atmosphere, keeping the concentration of oxygen in the pressure-equalizing reservoir from falling below about 90%. The pressure in the hose delivering oxygen from the equalizing reservoir is kept steady by a pressure-reducing valve.

Older units cycled for a period of about 20 seconds and supplied up to 5 litres per minute of 90+% oxygen. Since about 1999, units capable of supplying up to 10 L/min have been available.

Earlier oxygen concentrators employed two-bed molecular sieves; more recent designs incorporate multi-bed molecular sieves to allow continuous oxygen production during bed regeneration. Redundancy is provided by staggering 10 L/min molecular sieves. With this, over 960 L/min can be produced. The ramp-up time — the elapsed time until a multi-bed concentrator is producing oxygen at >90% concentration — is often less than 2 minutes, much faster than simple two-bed concentrators. The faster ramp-up improves sustainability for use in modern or emergency settings. The option to fill standard oxygen cylinders (e.g., 50 L at 200 bar = 10,000 L each) with high-pressure boosters, to ensure automatic failover to previously filled reserve cylinders and to ensure the oxygen supply chain, e.g., in case of power failure, is given with those systems.

=== Membrane separation ===
In membrane gas separation, membranes act as a permeable barrier, which different compounds move across at different rates or do not cross at all.

Gas mixtures can be effectively separated by synthetic membranes made from polymers such as polyamide or cellulose acetate, or from ceramic materials.

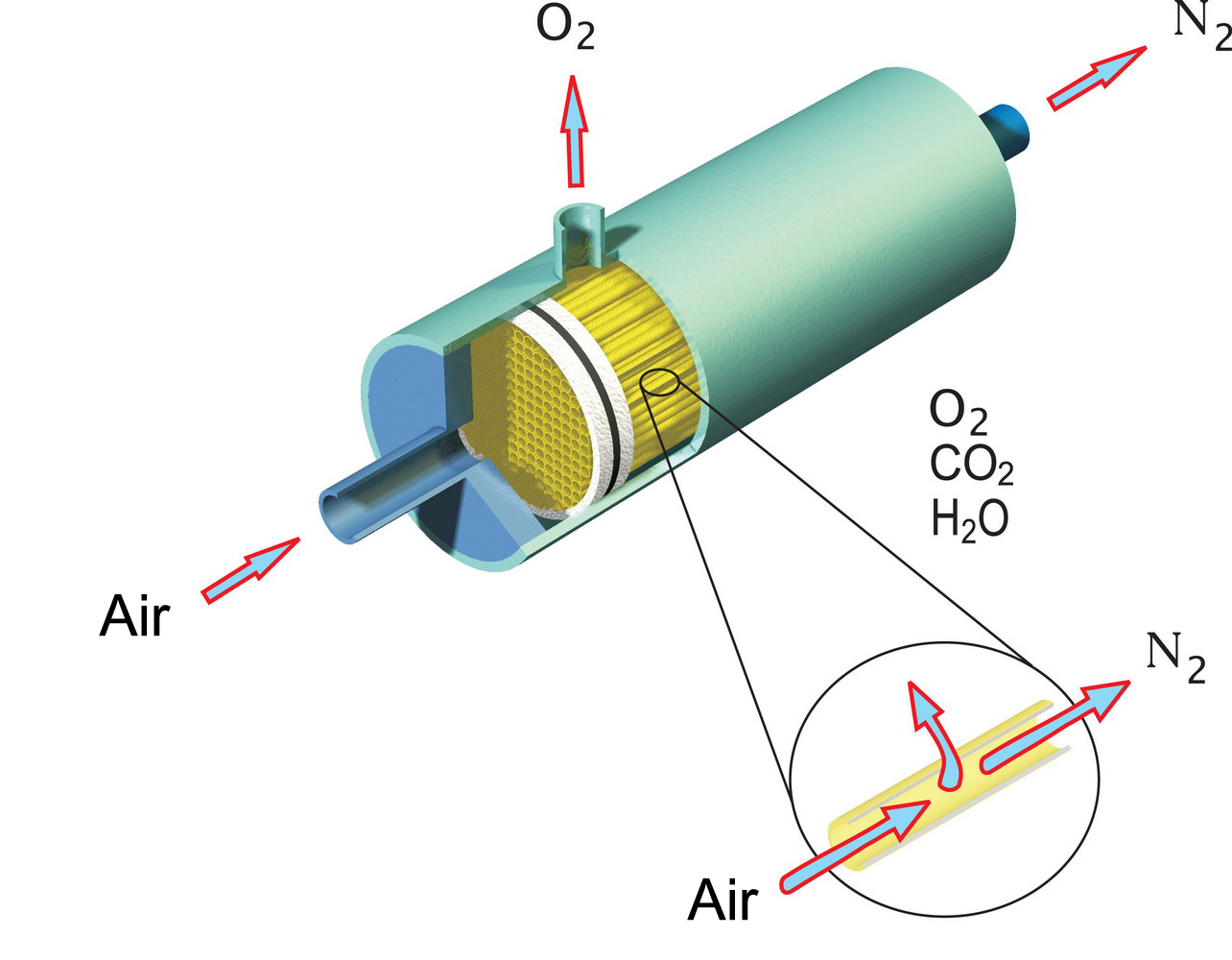
Membrane cartridge.

While polymeric membranes are economical and technologically useful, their performance is constrained by the Robeson limit (permeability must be sacrificed for selectivity and vice versa). This limit affects polymeric membrane use for CO_{2} separation from flue gas streams, since mass transport becomes limiting and CO_{2} separation becomes very expensive due to low permeabilities. Membrane materials have expanded into the realm of silica, zeolites, metal-organic frameworks, and perovskites, due to their strong thermal and chemical resistance as well as high tunability (ability to be modified and functionalized), leading to increased permeability and selectivity. Membranes can be used for separating gas mixtures, where they act as a permeable barrier through which different compounds move across at different rates or do not move at all. The membranes can be nanoporous, polymer, etc., and the gas molecules penetrate according to their size, diffusivity, and solubility.

Gas separation across a membrane is a pressure-driven process, driven by the difference in pressure between the inlet of the raw material and the outlet of product. The membrane used in the process is generally a non-porous layer, so there will not be a severe leakage of gas through the membrane. The performance of the membrane depends on permeability and selectivity. Permeability is affected by the penetrant size. Larger gas molecules have a lower diffusion coefficient. The polymer chain flexibility and free volume in the polymer of the membrane material influence the diffusion coefficient, as the space within the permeable membrane must be large enough for the gas molecules to diffuse across. The solubility is expressed as the ratio of the concentration of the gas in the polymer to the pressure of the gas in contact with it. Permeability is the ability of the membrane to allow the permeating gas to diffuse through the material of the membrane as a consequence of the pressure difference over the membrane, and can be measured in terms of the permeate flow rate, membrane thickness and area, and the pressure difference across the membrane. The selectivity of a membrane is a measure of the ratio of the permeabilities of the different gases for the membrane. It can be calculated as the ratio of permeability of two gases in binary separation.

The membrane gas separation equipment typically pumps gas into the membrane module, and the targeted gases are separated based on the difference in diffusivity and solubility. For example, oxygen will be separated from the ambient air and collected at the upstream side and nitrogen at the downstream side. As of 2016, membrane technology was reported as capable of producing 10 to 25 tonnes of 25% to 40% oxygen per day.

== Applications ==
Medical oxygen concentrators are used in hospitals or at home to concentrate oxygen for patients. They can be used in various industries, including medical, pharmaceutical production, water treatment, and glass manufacture.

PSA generators are particularly useful in remote or inaccessible parts of the world or mobile medical facilities (military hospitals, disaster facilities).

=== Portable oxygen concentrators ===
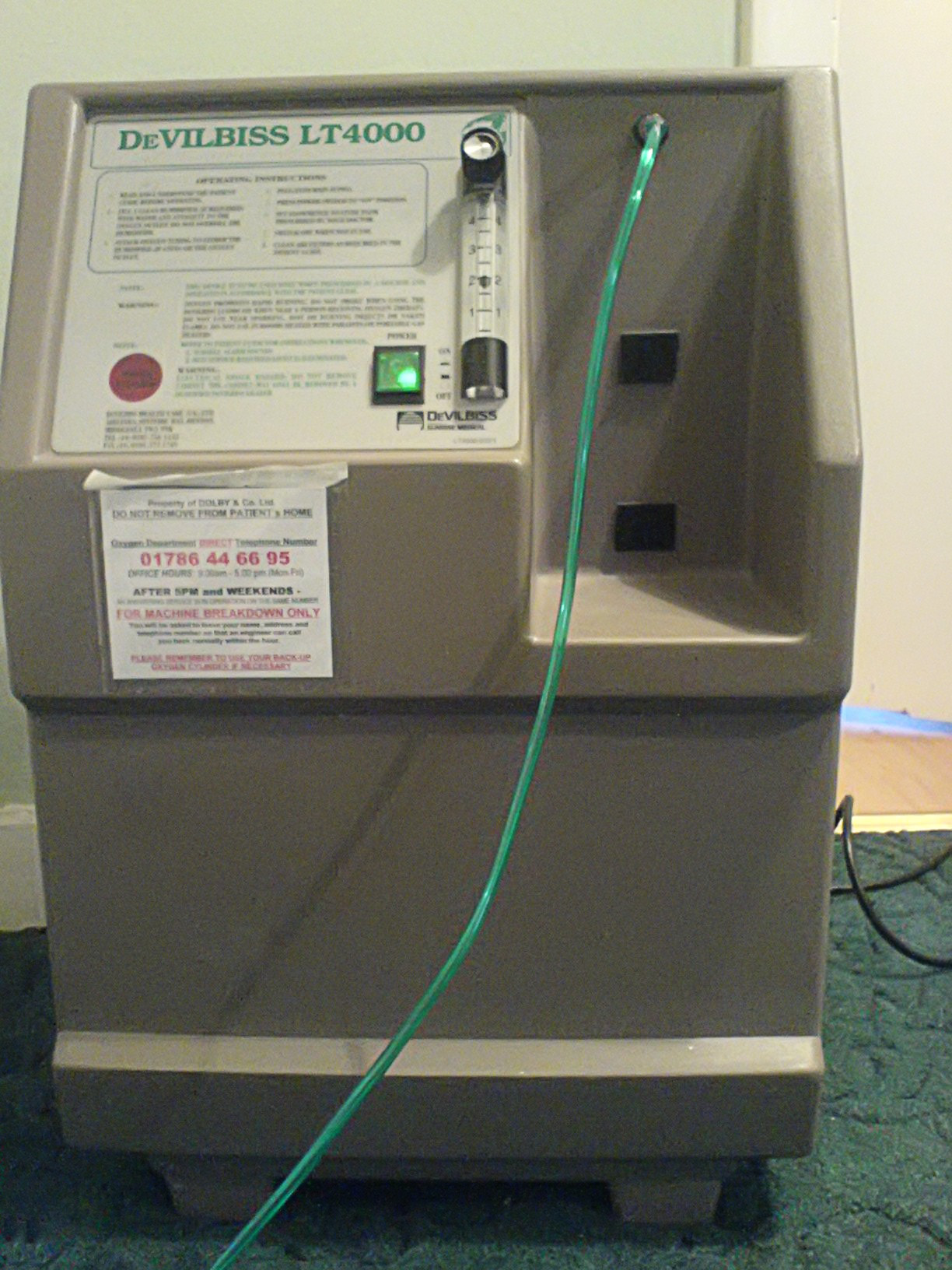
A home oxygen concentrator in an emphysema patient's house. The model shown is the DeVILBISS LT 4000.

Since the early 2000s, many companies have produced portable oxygen concentrators. Typically, these devices produce the equivalent of one to five liters per minute of continuous oxygen flow and they use some version of pulse flow or "demand flow" to deliver oxygen only when the patient is inhaling. They can also provide pulses of oxygen either to provide higher intermittent flows or to reduce power consumption.

Research into oxygen concentration is ongoing, and modern techniques suggest that the amount of adsorbent required by medical oxygen concentrators can be potentially "reduced by a factor of three while offering ~10–20% higher oxygen recovery compared to a typical commercial unit."

The FAA has approved the use of portable oxygen concentrators on commercial airlines. However, users of these devices should check in advance as to whether a particular brand or model is permitted on a particular airline. Unlike in commercial airlines, users of aircraft without cabin pressurization need oxygen concentrators that are able to deliver enough flowrate even at high altitudes.

Usually, "demand," or pulse-flow, oxygen concentrators are not used by patients while they sleep. There have been problems with the oxygen concentrators not being able to detect when the sleeping patient is inhaling. Some larger portable oxygen concentrators are designed to operate in a continuous-flow mode in addition to pulse-flow mode. Continuous-flow mode is considered safe for night use when coupled with a CPAP machine.

=== Alternate applications ===
Repurposed medical oxygen concentrators or specialized industrial oxygen concentrators can be made to operate small oxyacetylene or other fuel gas cutting, welding, and lampworking torches.

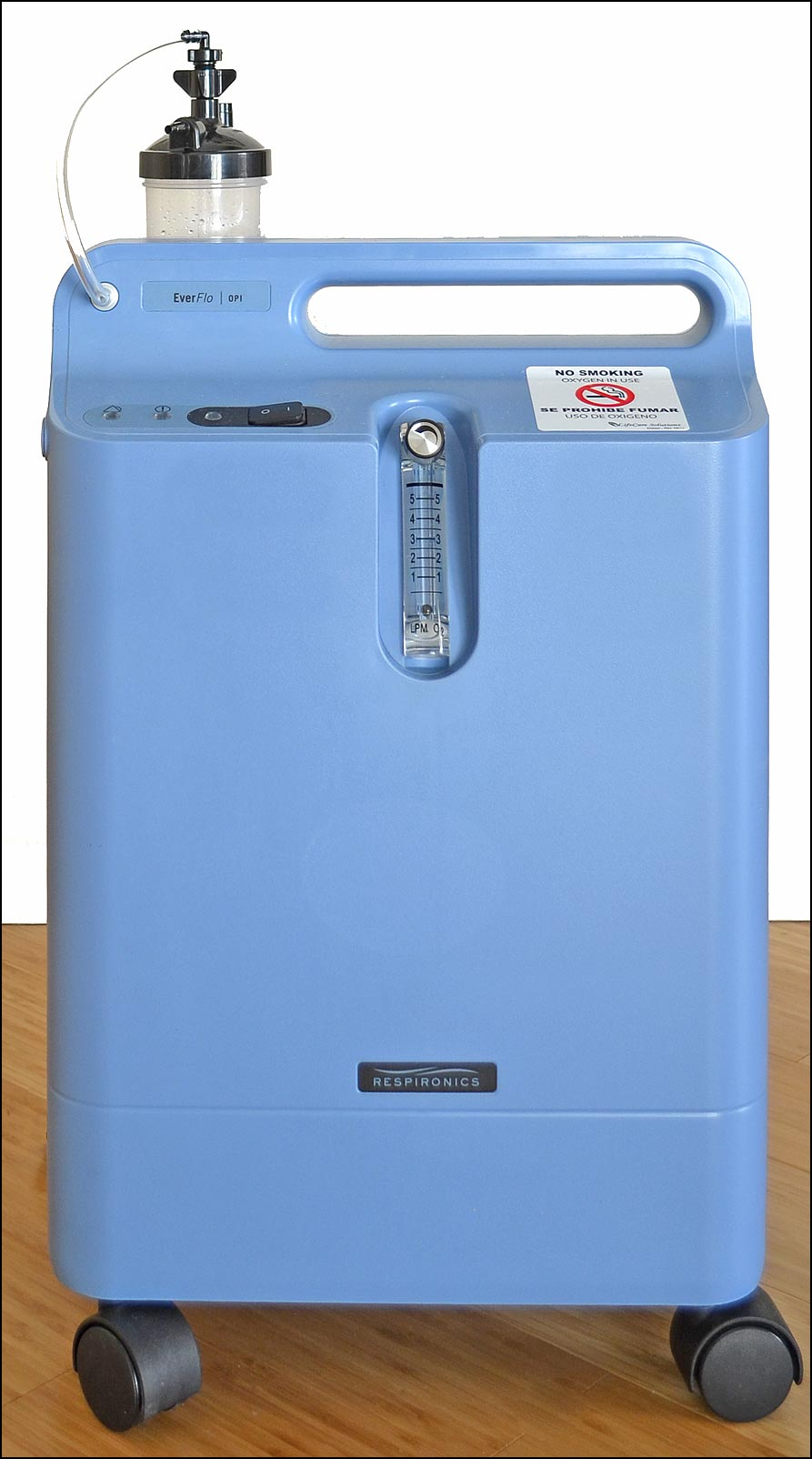
Philips Respironics Home Oxygen Concentrator.

=== Application of a PSA Oxygen Generator in Industries ===
Oxygen is widely needed for the oxidation of different chemicals for industrial purposes. Previously, these industries purchased oxygen cylinders in large numbers to meet their requirements, but it was very expensive, and oxygen cylinders were not always available in the market.

=== Paper industry ===
Oxygen is needed here for the bleaching of paper pulp with the help of the oxidation process to make the paper white. Moreover, lignin present in the wood is removed by the delignification process, which also needs oxygen.

=== Glass industry ===
Huge furnaces are needed to melt the raw materials that combine to form glass. Oxygen flares up the furnace's fire to burn at a higher temperature needed for the production of glass.

=== Chemical industries ===
Oxygen is needed for the oxidation of different chemicals to form the desired chemical substances. Waste chemical products are burnt down and destroyed in the incinerator with the help of oxygen; thus, the continuous supply of a bulk amount of oxygen is essential, which is possible only by a PSA oxygen generator.

== Safety ==
In both clinical and emergency-care situations, oxygen concentrators have the advantage of not being as dangerous as oxygen cylinders, which can, if ruptured or leaking, greatly increase the combustion rate of fire. As such, oxygen concentrators are particularly advantageous in military or disaster situations, where oxygen tanks may be dangerous or unfeasible.

Oxygen concentrators are considered sufficiently foolproof to be supplied to individual patients as a prescription item for use in their homes. Typically they are used as an adjunct to CPAP treatment of severe sleep apnea. There also are other medical uses for oxygen concentrators, including COPD and other respiratory diseases.

Users of home oxygen concentrators should have backup power or alternative oxygen sources in case of electric outages.

== Industrial oxygen concentrators ==
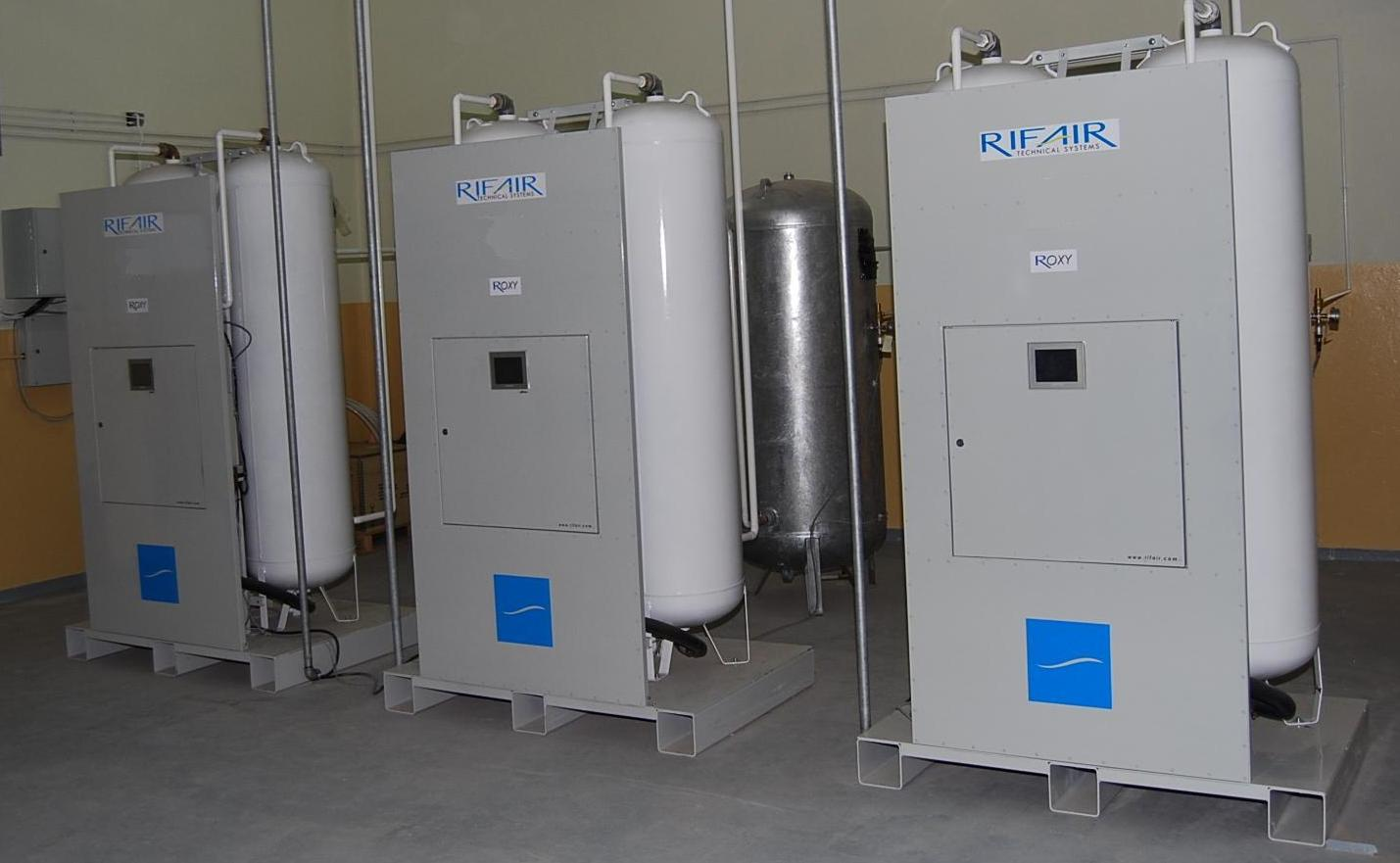
Pressure swing adsorption medical oxygen generator "R-OXY" by RIFAIR Technical Systems.

Industrial processes may use much higher pressures and flows than medical units. To meet that need, another process, called vacuum swing adsorption (VSA), has been developed by Air Products. This process uses a single low-pressure blower and a valve that reverses the flow through the blower so that the regeneration phase occurs under a vacuum. Generators using this process are being marketed to the aquaculture industry. Industrial oxygen concentrators are often available in a much wider range of capacities than medical concentrators.

Industrial oxygen concentrators are sometimes referred to as oxygen generators within the oxygen and ozone industries to distinguish them from medical oxygen concentrators. The distinction is used in an attempt to clarify that industrial oxygen concentrators are not medical devices approved by the Food and Drug Administration (FDA) and they are not suitable for use as bedside medical concentrators. However, applying the oxygen generator nomenclature can lead to confusion. The term oxygen generator is a misnomer in that the oxygen is not generated as it is with a chemical oxygen generator, but rather it is concentrated from the air.

Industrial concentrators require regulatory approval and additional filtration before integration into medical oxygen supply systems.

== During the COVID-19 pandemic ==
The COVID-19 pandemic increased the demand for oxygen concentrators. During the pandemic open source oxygen concentrators were developed, locally manufactured – with prices below imported products – and used, especially during a COVID-19 pandemic wave in India.

== See also ==
- Nitrogen separation membrane – Air-to-nitrogen production complexes
- Oxygen therapy – Use of oxygen as a medical treatment
- Portable oxygen concentrator – Device used to provide oxygen therapy
- Membrane gas separation – Technology for splitting specific gases out of mixtures
