= Torkel Lende =

Norwegian inventor

Torkel Jonson Lende (17 November 1849 – 11 January 1909) was a Norwegian inventor.

In his young days he was a schoolmate of Arne Garborg. Like Garborg he took up teacher's studies, but he quit early to become an inventor. In 1873 Lende went on a tour of the Måløy area together with Sven Aarrestad; they were hired by Vestmannalaget to spread Landsmål culture.

== Inventions ==
He first made inventions for small-scale home industry, but was soon picked up by the large-scale industry in Stavanger. Among his inventions there was a device to cut European sprat for the tinned food industry in the city.
