= Portable oxygen concentrator =

Device used to provide oxygen therapy

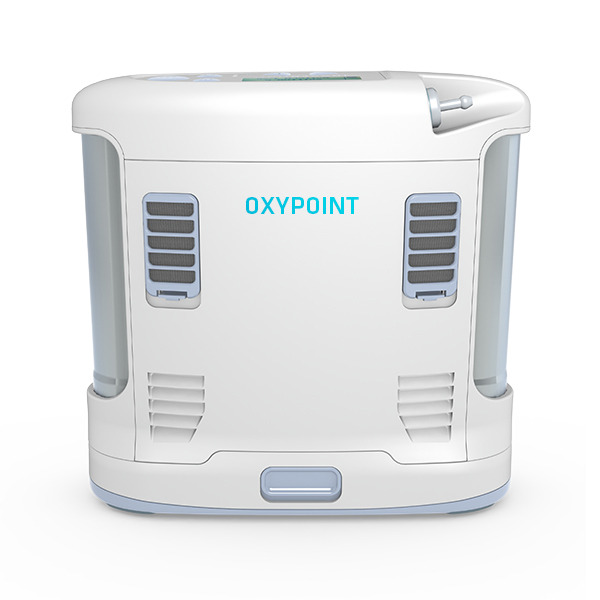
A lightweight portable oxygen concentrator: Inogen One G3 (2,2 kg)

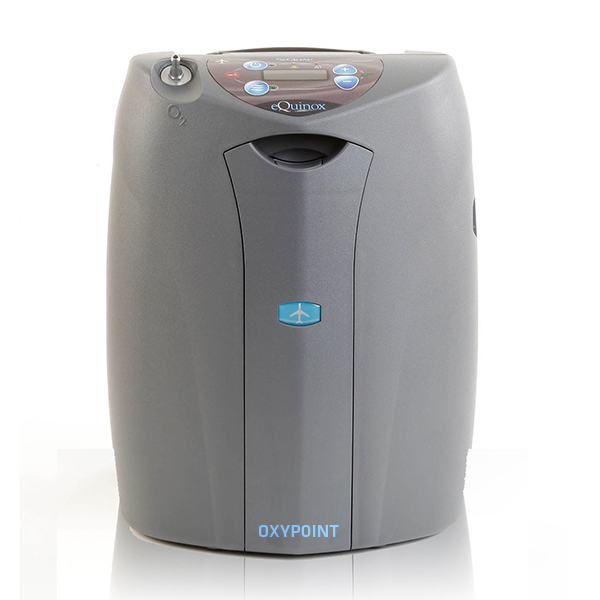
Sequal Equinox, transportable concentrator with a high oxygen flow rate

A portable oxygen concentrator (POC) is a device used to provide oxygen therapy to people that require greater oxygen concentrations than the levels of ambient air. It is similar to a home oxygen concentrator (OC), but is smaller in size and more mobile. They are small enough to carry and many are now FAA-approved for use on airplanes.

== Development ==
Medical oxygen concentrators were developed in the late 1970s. Early manufacturers included Union Carbide and Bendix Corporation. They were initially conceived of as a method of providing a continuous source of home oxygen without the use of heavy tanks and frequent deliveries.

Beginning in the 2000s, manufacturers developed portable versions. Since their initial development, reliability has been improved, and POCs have between one and six settings which are not the same as liters per minute (LPM).

The latest models of intermittent flow only products have weighed in the range of from 2.8 to 9.9 pounds (1.3 to 4.5 kg), and continuous flow (CF) units have been between 10 and 20 pounds (4.5 to 9.0 kg).

== Operation ==
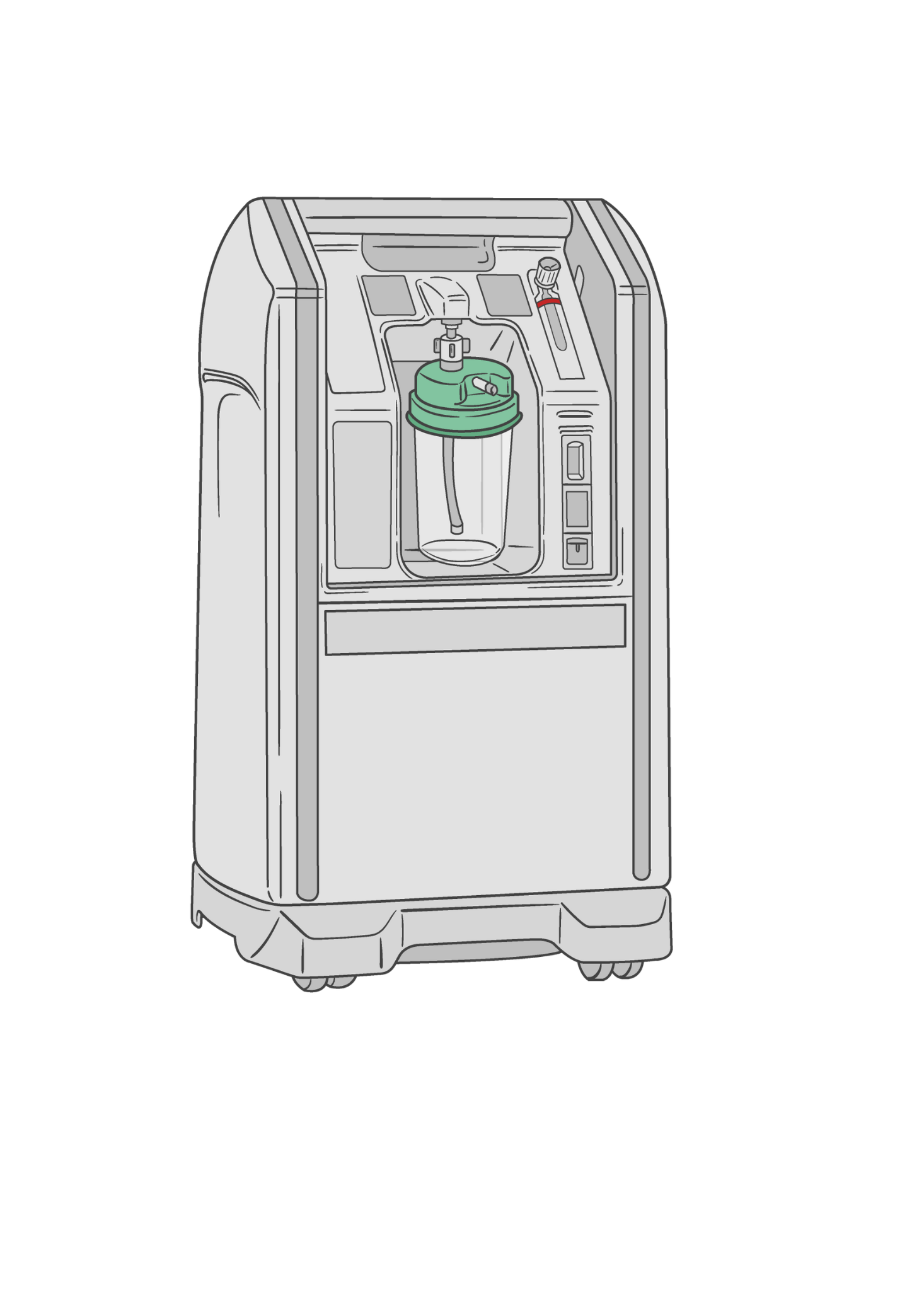
Portable oxygen concentrator used with bottle humidifier

POCs operate on the same principle as a home concentrator, pressure swing adsorption. The basic set up of a POC is a miniaturized air compressor, a cylinder filled containing the sieve, a pressure equalizing reservoir and valves and tubes.

During the first half of the first cycle the internal compressor forces this air through a system of chemical filters known as a molecular sieve. Filter surfaces are zeolite (microporous, crystalline aluminosilicate) that attract (via adsorption) nitrogen molecules more strongly than oxygen molecules – this takes the nitrogen out of the air leaving more concentrated oxygen behind. When the desired purity is reached and the first cylinder reaches roughly 20 psi the oxygen and small amounts of other gases are released into the pressure equalizing reservoir. As the pressure in the first cylinder drops the nitrogen is desorbed, the valve is closed, and the gas is vented into the ambient air. Most of the oxygen produced is delivered to the patient; part is fed back into the sieves (at greatly reduced pressure) to flush away left over nitrogen, and prepare the zeolite for the next cycle. The atmosphere contains around 21% oxygen and 78% nitrogen; the 1% remainder is a mixture of other gases which pass through this process. A POC system is functionally a nitrogen scrubber capable of consistently producing medical-grade oxygen of up to 90%.

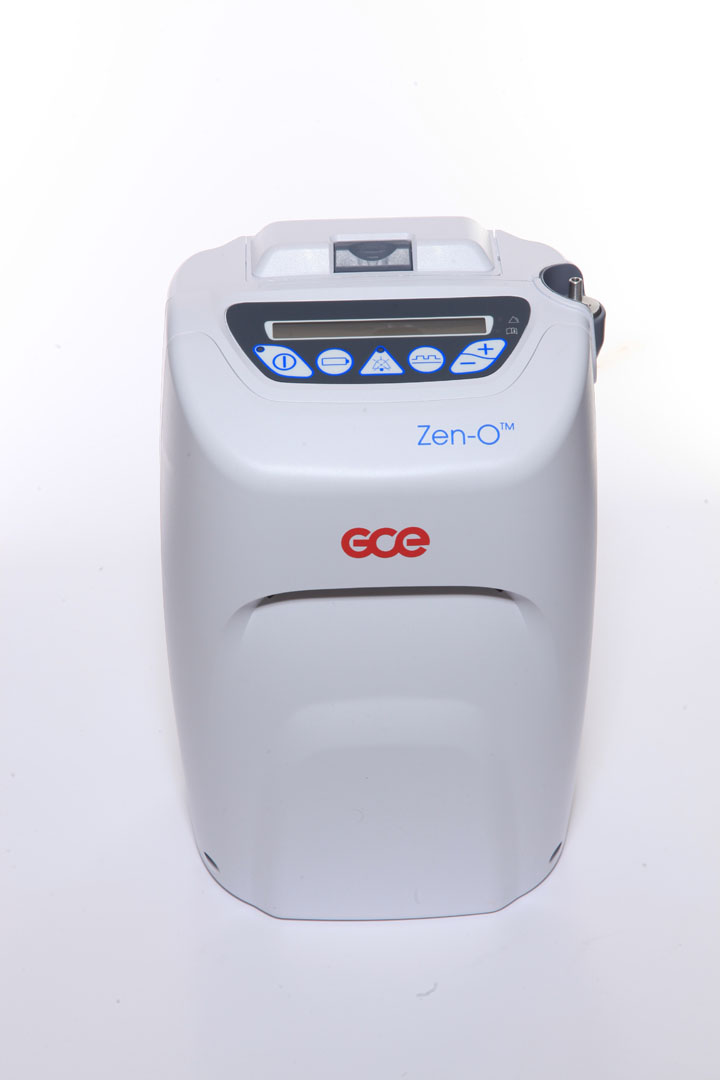
A Zen-O portable oxygen concentrator; it is capable of pulse and continuous flow operation

The most important consideration for a POC is its ability to supply adequate supplementary oxygen to relieve hypoxia (oxygen deficiency) during normal activities and based on the patient's breathing cycles. Other variables include maximum oxygen purity, the number and increment of settings for adjusting oxygen flow, and battery capacity (or number of add-on batteries) and power cord options for recharging.

=== Pulse dose ===
Pulse dose (also called intermittent-flow or on-demand) POCs are the smallest units, often weighing as little as 5 pounds (2.2 kg). Their small size enables the patient to not waste energy gained from the treatment on carrying them. Here the unit intermittently administers a volume (or bolus) of oxygen in milliliters per breath (mL/breath). Their ability to conserve oxygen is key to keeping the units so compact without sacrificing the duration of oxygen supply. Most of the current POC systems provide oxygen on a pulse (on-demand) delivery and are used with a nasal cannula to deliver the oxygen to the patient.

=== Continuous flow ===
With continuous flow units, oxygen delivery is measured in LPM (liters per minute). Providing continuous flow requires a larger molecular sieve and pump/motor assembly, and additional electronics. This increases the device's size and weight (approximately 18–20 lbs).

With on-demand or pulse flow, delivery is measured by the size (in milliliters) of the "bolus" of oxygen per breath.

Some Portable Oxygen Concentrator units offer both continuous flow as well as pulse flow oxygen.

== Some uses ==
Medical:

Allows patients to utilize oxygen therapy 24/7 and reduce mortality as much 1.94 times less than for just overnight use.
Helps improve exercise tolerance, by allowing the user to exercise longer.
Helps increase stamina throughout day-to-day activities.
A POC is a safer option than carrying around an oxygen tank since it makes the purer gas on demand.
POC units are consistently smaller and lighter than tank-based systems and can provide a longer supply of oxygen.

Commercial:

Glass blowing industry
Skin care
Non-pressurized aircraft
Nightclub Oxygen Bars although doctors and the FDA have expressed some concern with this.

== FAA approval ==
On 13 May 2009, the United States Department of Transportation (DOT) ruled that air carriers conducting passenger flights of greater capacity than 19 seats must allow travelers with a disability to use an FAA-approved POC. The DOT rules have been adopted by many international airlines. A list of POCs approved for air travel is on the FAA website.

== Nighttime use ==
On-demand units are not advised for patients who experience oxygen desaturation due to sleep apnea, and a CPAP mask is generally advised for them.

For patients whose desaturation is due to shallow breathing, the nighttime use of POCs is a useful therapy.

Nighttime use has been facilitated by the advent of alarms and technology that detects a patient's slower breathing during sleep and adjusts the flow or bolus size accordingly.

== See also ==
- Hyperbaric Oxygen Therapy – Medical treatment at raised ambient pressure
- Oxygen bar – Establishment that sells oxygen for on-site recreational use
- Oxygen concentrator – Device that removes nitrogen from air
