= Klaus Linde =

German physician (born 1960)

- Born: 1960 (age 65–66); Munich, Germany
- Education: LMU Munich, Humboldt University of Berlin
- Scientific career
- Fields: Alternative medicine
- Workplaces: Technical University of Munich
- Thesis: Systematische Übersichtsarbeiten und Meta-Analysen : Anwendungsbeispiele und empirisch-methodische Untersuchungen (2002)

Klaus Linde (born 1960 in Munich) is a German physician and alternative medicine researcher. He works at the Centre for Complementary Medicine Research at the Technical University of Munich in Germany.

== Education and career ==
Linde received his MD from LMU Munich in 1990 and his PhD in epidemiology from the Humboldt University of Berlin in 2002. Since 1998 he has been the deputy director of the Centre for Complementary Medicine Research at the Technical University of Munich.

== Research ==
He is known for his research into the effectiveness of St. John's wort, which has found that it is as effective as Prozac for treating major depression, and that German trials of the herb tend to be more positive than do trials from other countries.

He is also known for his studies of the effectiveness of acupuncture. A 2005 study by Linde, for example, found that real acupuncture was no more effective in the treatment of migraines than sham acupuncture, but that both were more effective than no treatment. He has also authored multiple Cochrane reviews on the effectiveness of acupuncture with similar conclusions.

He has also published several papers about the effectiveness of homeopathy. These include a well-known 1997 meta-analysis which found an odds ratio of 2.45 in favor of homeopathy over placebo. However, this review also concluded that there was insufficient evidence that homeopathy was clearly effective for any single condition. A subsequent study by Linde et al. re-examined the data from his 1997 meta-analysis and found that higher quality trials of homeopathy tended to find that homeopathy was ineffective.
