= Carl von Linde =

German engineer and scientist

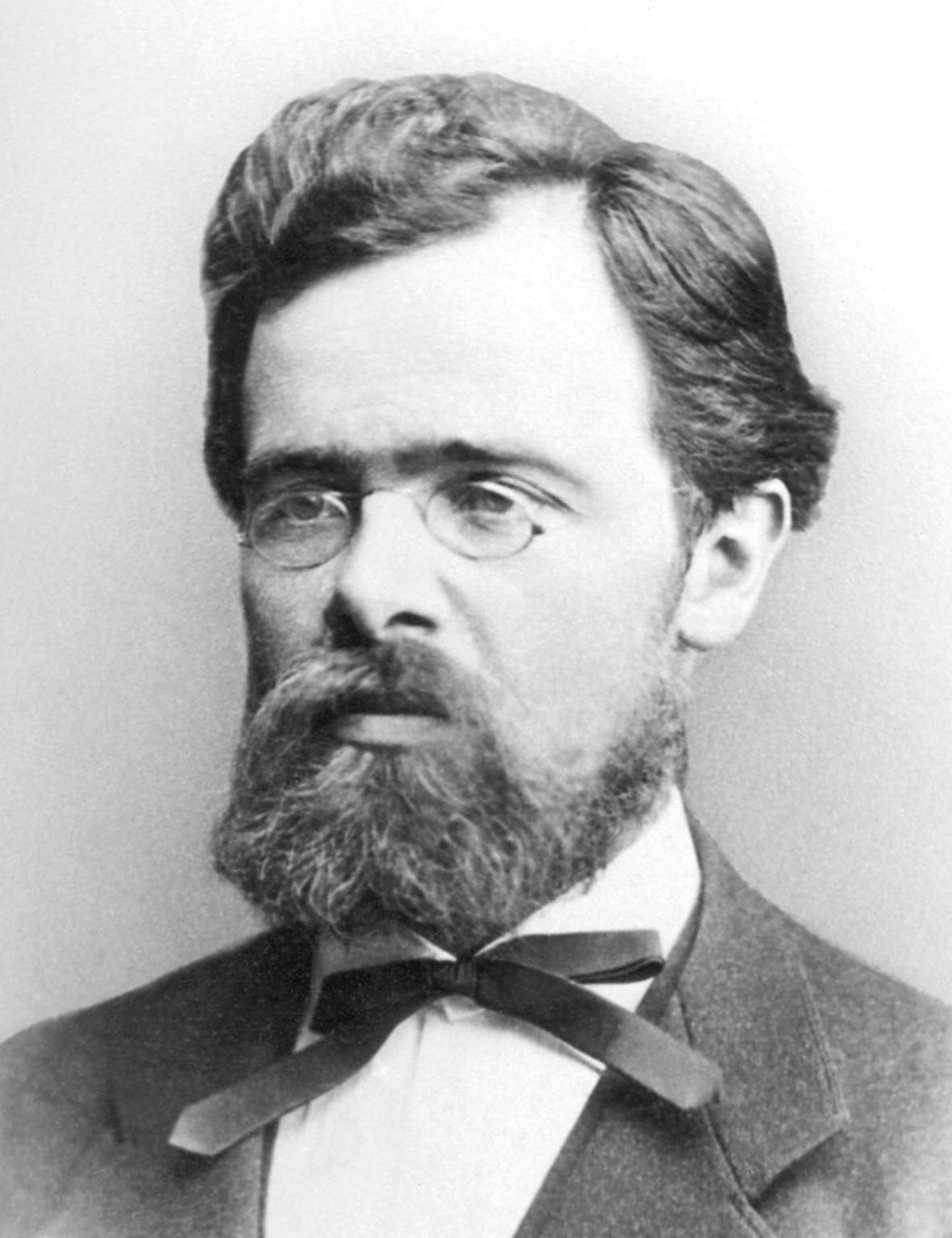
- Carl von Linde in 1868
- Born: 11 June 1842; Berndorf, Kingdom of Bavaria, German Confederation
- Died: 16 November 1934 (aged 92); Munich, Bavaria, Germany
- Occupations: Scientist, engineer, businessman
- Years active: 1868—1914
- Known for: Founder of Linde plc Oxyliquit; Linde double-column process Linde–Frank–Caro process Hampson–Linde cycle
- Awards: Wilhelm Exner Medal (1922); Pour le Mérite for Sciences and Arts (1918); Werner von Siemens Ring (1916); Elliott Cresson Medal (1914)

Carl Paul Gottfried von Linde (11 June 1842 – 16 November 1934) was a German scientist, engineer, and businessman. He discovered the refrigeration cycle and invented the first industrial-scale air separation and gas liquefaction processes, which led to the first reliable and efficient compressed-ammonia refrigerator in 1876.

Linde was the founder of the company now known as Linde plc but formerly known (variously) as the Linde division of Union Carbide, Linde, Linde Air Products, Praxair, and others. This company is the world's largest producer of industrial gases and ushered in the creation of the global supply chain for industrial gases.

Linde was a member of scientific and engineering associations, including being on the board of trustees of the Physikalisch-Technische Reichsanstalt and the Bavarian Academy of Sciences and Humanities. He was knighted in 1897 as Ritter von Linde.

== Biography ==
=== Early years ===
Born in Berndorf, Bavaria as the son of a German-born minister and a Swedish mother, he was expected to follow in his father's footsteps but took another direction entirely. Von Linde's family moved to Munich in 1854, and eight years later he started a course in engineering at the Swiss Federal Institute of Technology in Zurich, Switzerland, where his teachers included Rudolf Clausius, Gustav Zeuner and Franz Reuleaux.

In 1864, he was expelled before graduating for participating in a student protest, but Reuleaux found him a position as an apprentice at the Kottern cotton-spinning plant in Kempten. Linde stayed only a short time before moving first to Borsig in Berlin and then to the new Krauss locomotive factory in Munich, where he worked as head of the technical department. Von Linde married Helene Grimm in September 1866; their marriage lasted 53 years and they had six children.

In 1868 Linde learned of a new university opening in Munich (the Technische Hochschule) and immediately applied for a job as a lecturer; he was accepted—at the age of 26—for the position. He became a full professor of mechanical engineering in 1872, and set up an engineering lab where students such as Rudolf Diesel studied.

=== Middle years ===
In 1870 and 1871, Linde published articles in the Bavarian Industry and Trade Journal describing his research findings in the area of refrigeration. Linde's first refrigeration plants were commercially successful, and development began to take up increasing amounts of his time. In 1879, he gave up his professorship and founded the Gesellschaft für Lindes Eismaschinen Aktiengesellschaft ("Linde's Ice Machine Company"), now Linde plc, in Wiesbaden, Germany. After a slow start in a difficult German economy, business picked up quickly in the 1880s. The efficient new refrigeration technology offered big benefits to the breweries, and by 1890 Linde had sold 747 machines. In addition to the breweries, other uses for the new technology were found in slaughterhouses and cold storage facilities all over Europe.

In 1888, Linde moved back to Munich where he took up his professorship once more but was soon back at work developing new refrigeration cycles. In 1892, an order from the Guinness brewery in Dublin for a carbon dioxide liquefaction plant drove Linde's research into the area of low-temperature refrigeration, and in 1894 he started work on a process for the liquefaction of air. In 1895, Linde first achieved success, and filed for patent protection of his process (not approved in the US until 1903). In 1901, Linde began work on a technique to obtain pure oxygen and nitrogen based on the fractional distillation of liquefied air. By 1910, coworkers including Carl's son Friedrich had developed the Linde double-column process, variants of which are still in common use today.

After a decade, Linde withdrew from managerial activities to refocus on research, and in 1895 he succeeded in liquefying air by first compressing it and then letting it expand rapidly, thereby cooling it. He then obtained oxygen and nitrogen from the liquid air by slow warming. In the early days of oxygen production, the biggest use by far for the gas was the oxyacetylene torch, invented in France in 1903, which revolutionized metal cutting and welding in the construction of ships, skyscrapers, and other iron and steel structures.

In 1897, Linde was appointed to the Order of Merit of the Bavarian Crown and ennobled in accordance with its statutes.

In addition to Linde's technical and engineering abilities, he was a successful entrepreneur. He formed many successful partnerships in Germany and internationally, working effectively to exploit the value of his patents and knowledge through licensing arrangements.

In 1906, Linde negotiated a stake in Brin's Oxygen Company, renamed The BOC Group. in exchange for rights to Linde's patents in the UK and other countries, and held a board position until 1914. Linde also formed the Linde Air Products Company in the USA in 1907, a company that passed through US Government control to Union Carbide in the 1940s and on to form Praxair. In 2005 Linde, plc bought the BOC Group, and in 2019 Linde plc merged with Praxair, thus combining all three companies founded by Linde.

=== Later years and death ===
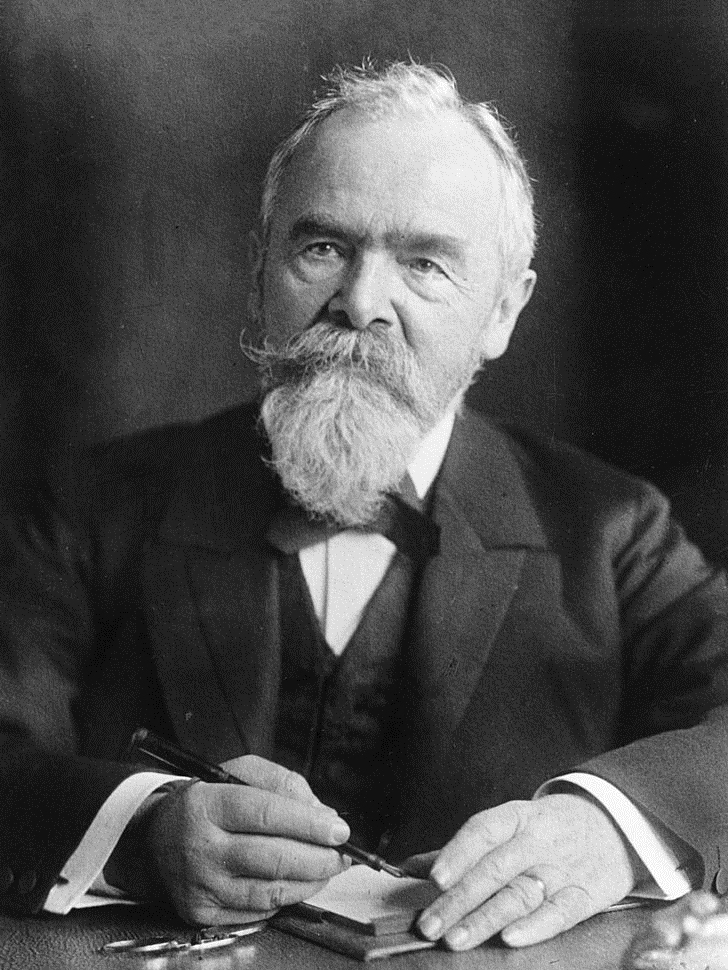
Von Linde in 1925

From around 1910, Linde started transferring responsibility for the company's operation to his sons Friedrich and Richard and to his son-in-law Rudolf Wucherer. He continued with supervisory board and advisory duties until his death.

Carl von Linde died in Munich in November 1934 at the age of 92.

== Key inventions ==
Linde's first refrigeration system used dimethyl ether as the refrigerant and was built by Maschinenfabrik Augsburg (now MAN AG) for the Spaten Brewery in 1873. He quickly moved on to develop more reliable ammonia-based cycles. These were early examples of vapor-compression refrigeration machines, and ammonia is still in wide use as a refrigerant in industrial applications.

His apparatus for the liquefaction of air combined the cooling effect achieved by allowing a compressed gas to expand (the Joule–Thomson effect first observed by James Prescott Joule and Lord Kelvin) with a counter-current heat exchange technique that used the cold air produced by expansion to chill ambient air entering the apparatus. Over a period of time this effect gradually cooled the apparatus and air within it to the point of liquefaction.

Linde followed development of air liquefaction equipment with equipment that also separated air into its constituent parts using distillation processes.

Linde's inventions and developments spurred development in many areas of cryogenics, physics, chemistry and engineering.

=== Patents ===
- CH10704 – 31 January 1896 – Gasverflüssigungs-maschine (Machine for the liquefaction of gas) (in German) – Switzerland
- GB189512528 – 16 May 1896 – Process and Apparatus for Liquefying Gases or Gaseous Mixtures, and for Producing Cold, more particularly applicable for Separating Oxygen from Atmospheric Air – UK
- US727,650 – 12 May 1903 – Linde oxygen process – US
- US728,173 – 12 May 1903 – Equipment for Linde oxygen process – US
- US795,525 – 25 July 1905 – Equipment for Linde oxygen and nitrogen process – US

== Awards ==
- Wilhelm Exner Medal, 1922

== See also ==
- Air separation
- Cryogenic nitrogen plant
- Industrial gas
- Timeline of low-temperature technology
- German inventors and discoverers
