= Nitrogen generator =

Air-to-nitrogen production complexes

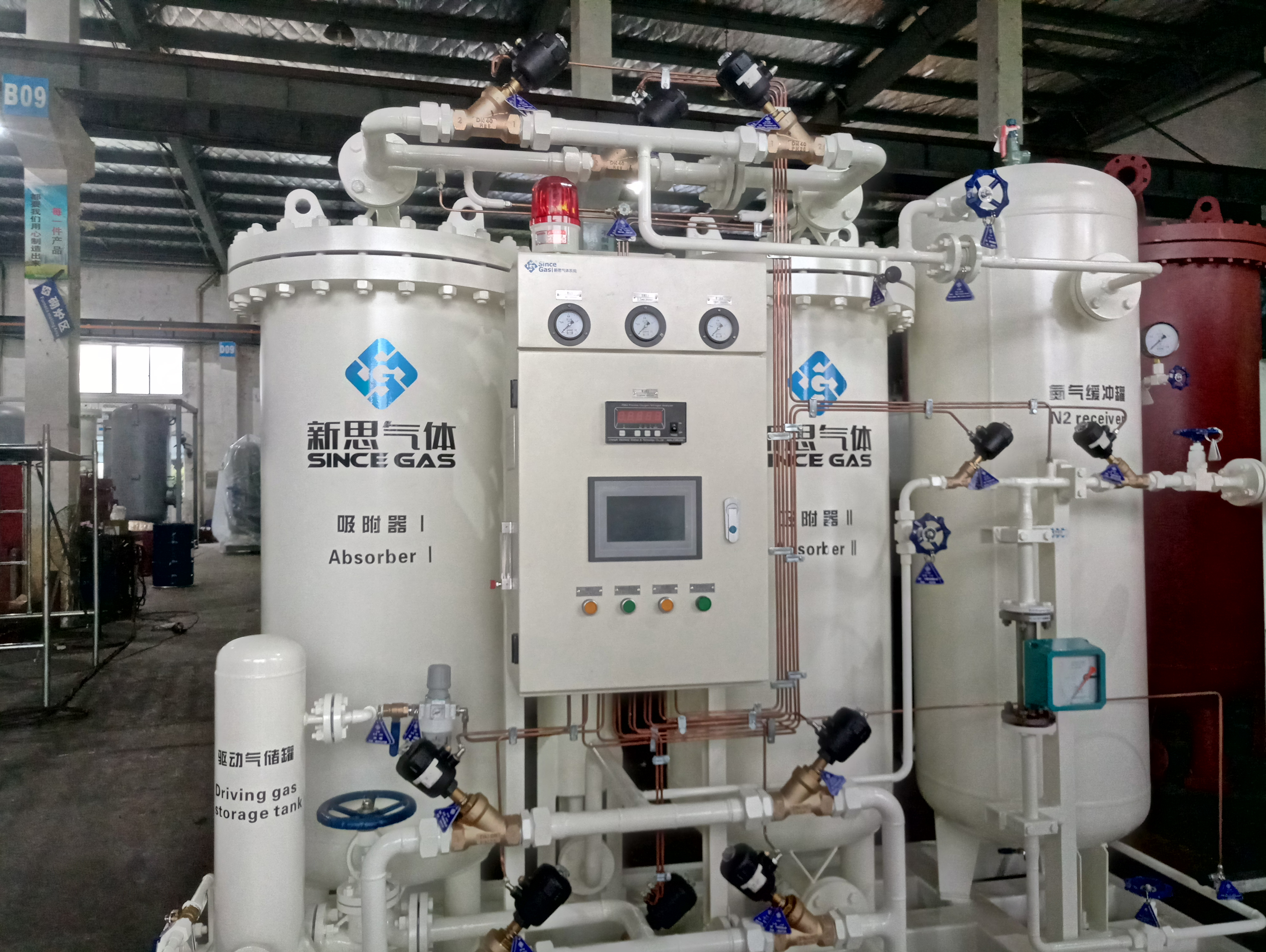
A PSA nitrogen generator

Nitrogen generators are devices used to produce nitrogen from other gas mixtures, usually using air.

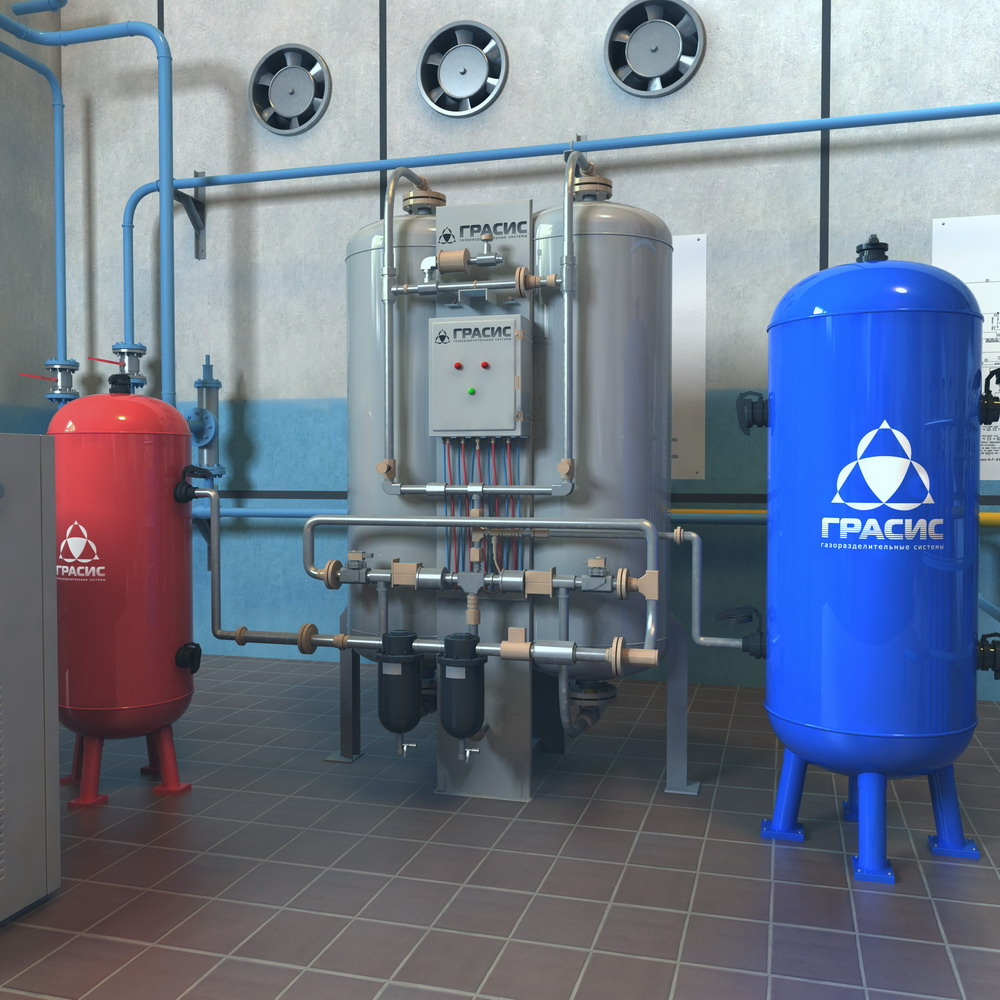
Adsorption nitrogen generator

== Adsorption technology ==
=== Adsorption concept ===
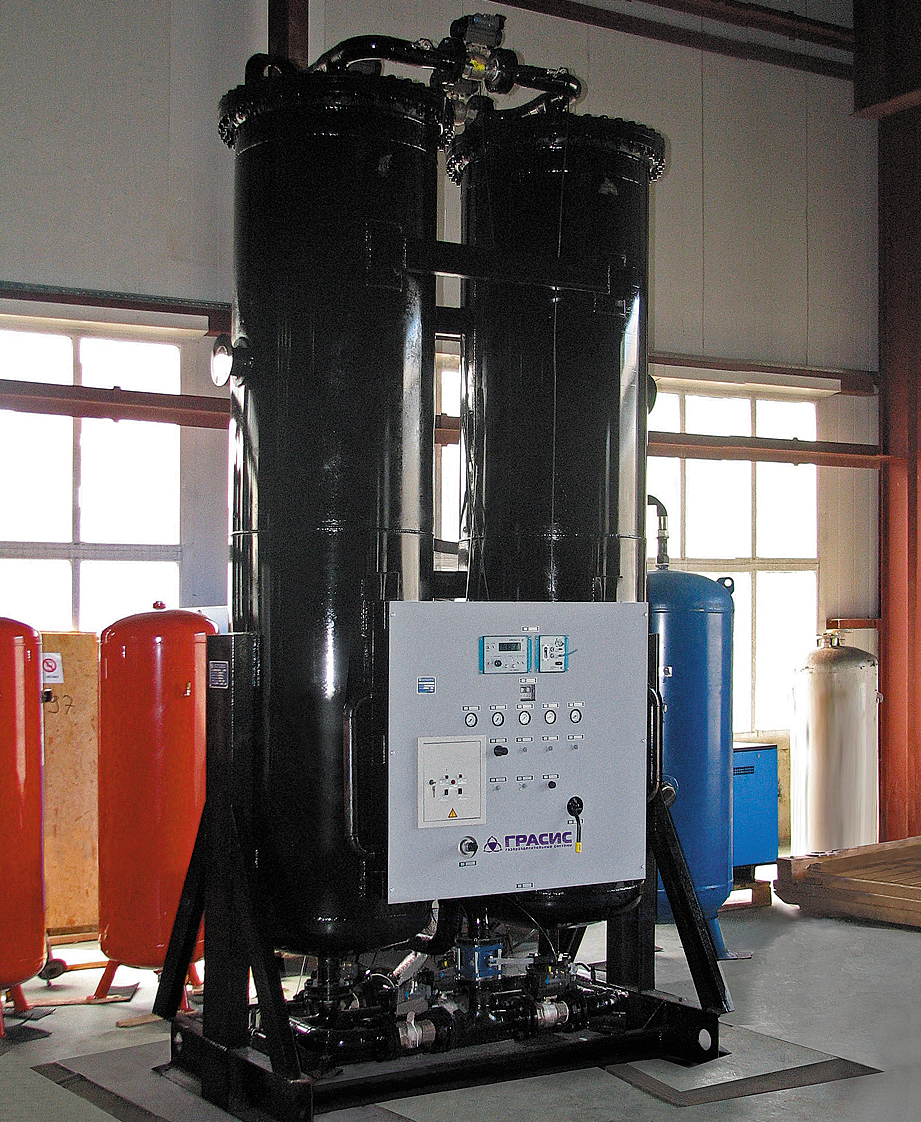
Adsorption nitrogen generator

The adsorption gas separation process in nitrogen generators is based on the phenomenon of fixing various gas mixture components by a solid substance called an adsorbent. This phenomenon is brought about by the gas and adsorbent molecules' interaction.

=== Pressure swing adsorption technology ===
The swing adsorption process in each of the two adsorbers consists of two stages running for a few minutes. During the first stage, the adsorption stage, oxygen, water and carbon dioxide molecules diffuse into the pore structure of the adsorbent. The nitrogen molecules are allowed to travel through the adsorber-adsorbent-containing vessel, while the other component gasses are unable to pass through. At the regeneration stage, the adsorbed components are released from the adsorbent and vented into the atmosphere.

=== Advantages ===
- Higher nitrogen purity at lower operating costs: The net cost of nitrogen produced by PSA nitrogen generators is typically less than the cost of bottled or liquefied nitrogen. PSA technology can generally produce nitrogen at a higher purity per operating cost than membrane technology.
- Environmental impact: Compared to the energy needed for a cryogenic air separation plant and the energy needed to transport the liquid nitrogen from the plant to the facility, generating nitrogen through PSA consumes less energy and creates far fewer greenhouse gases.

== Membrane technology ==
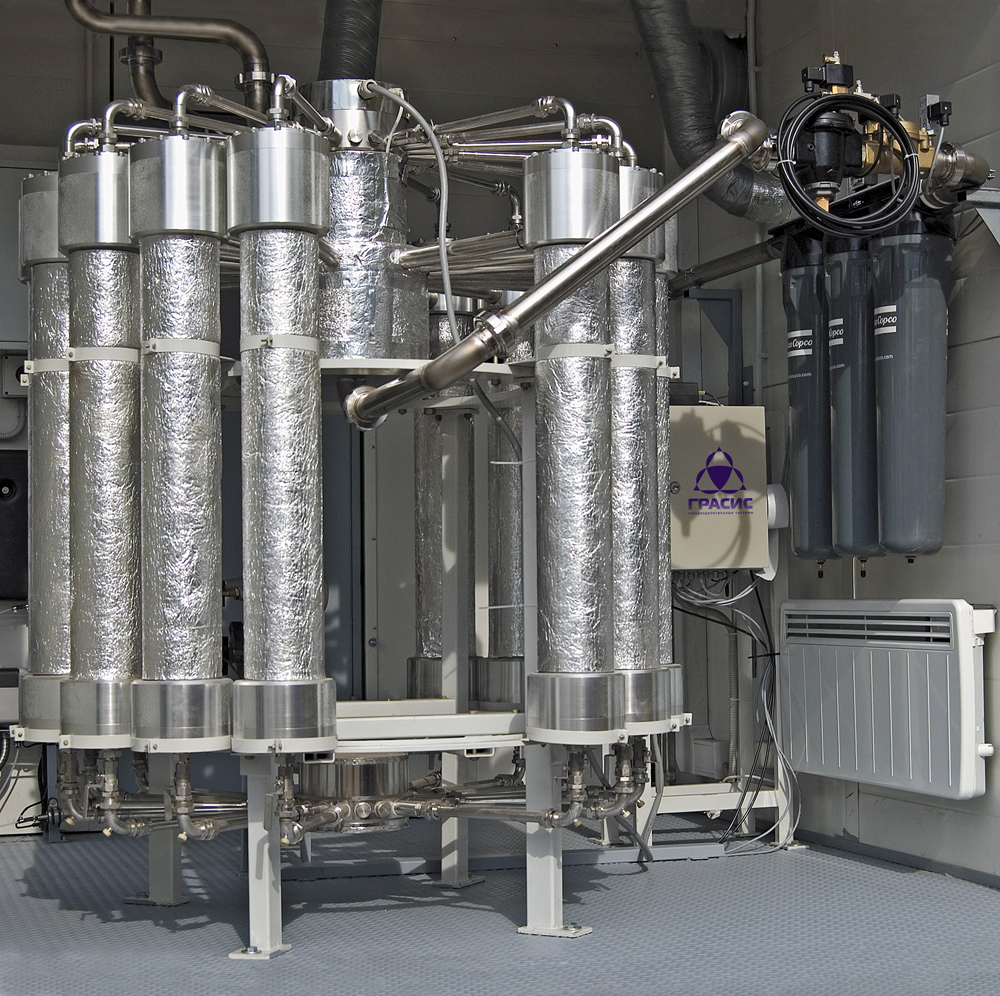
Membrane nitrogen generator

=== Gas separation concept ===
The operation of membrane systems is based on the principle of differential velocity with which various gas mixture components permeate membrane substance. The driving force in the gas separation process is the difference in partial pressures on different membrane sides.

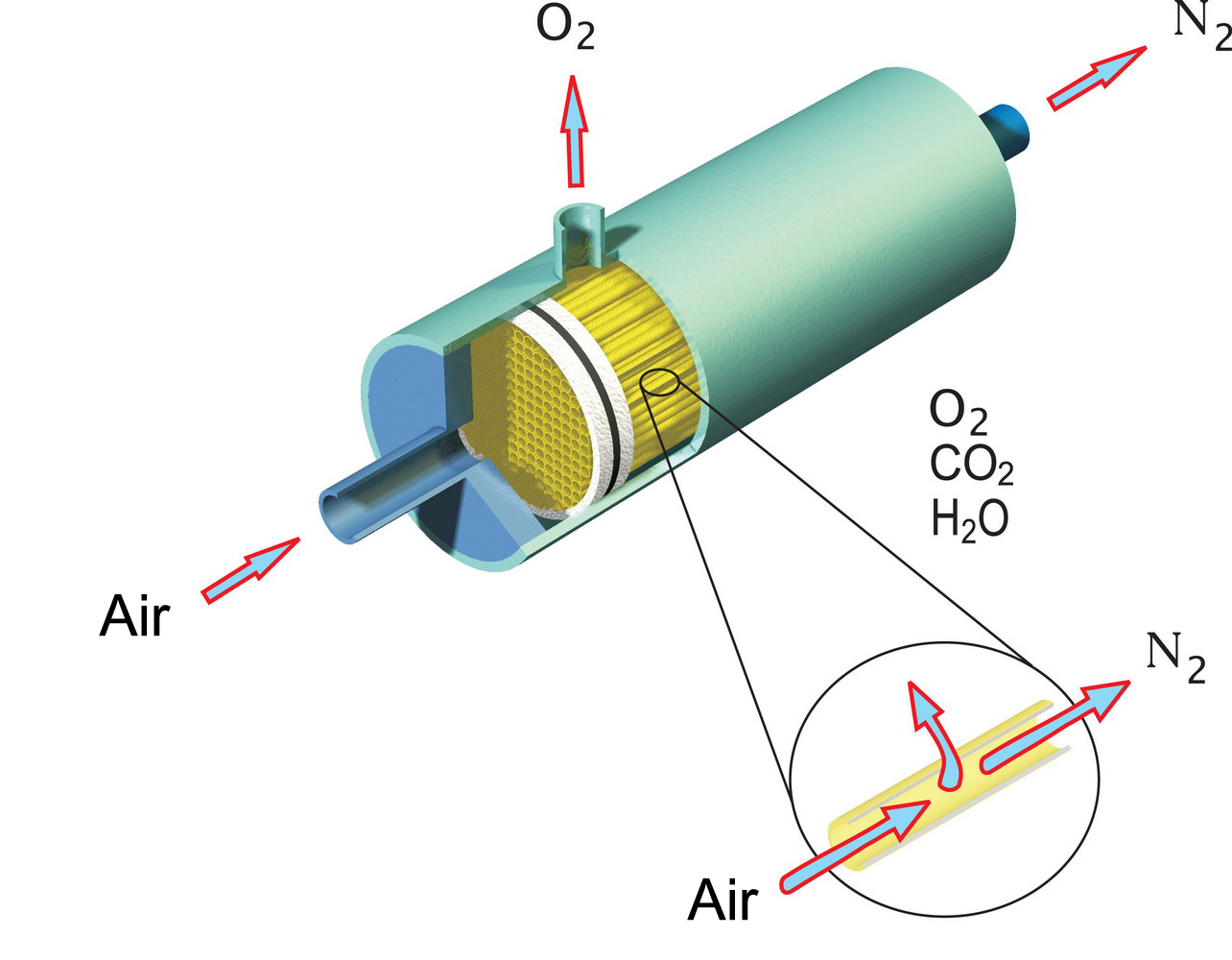
Flux distribution inside the fiber

=== Advantages ===
- Economic benefits: The net cost of nitrogen produced by nitrogen complexes is generally less than the cost of cylinder or liquefied nitrogen.

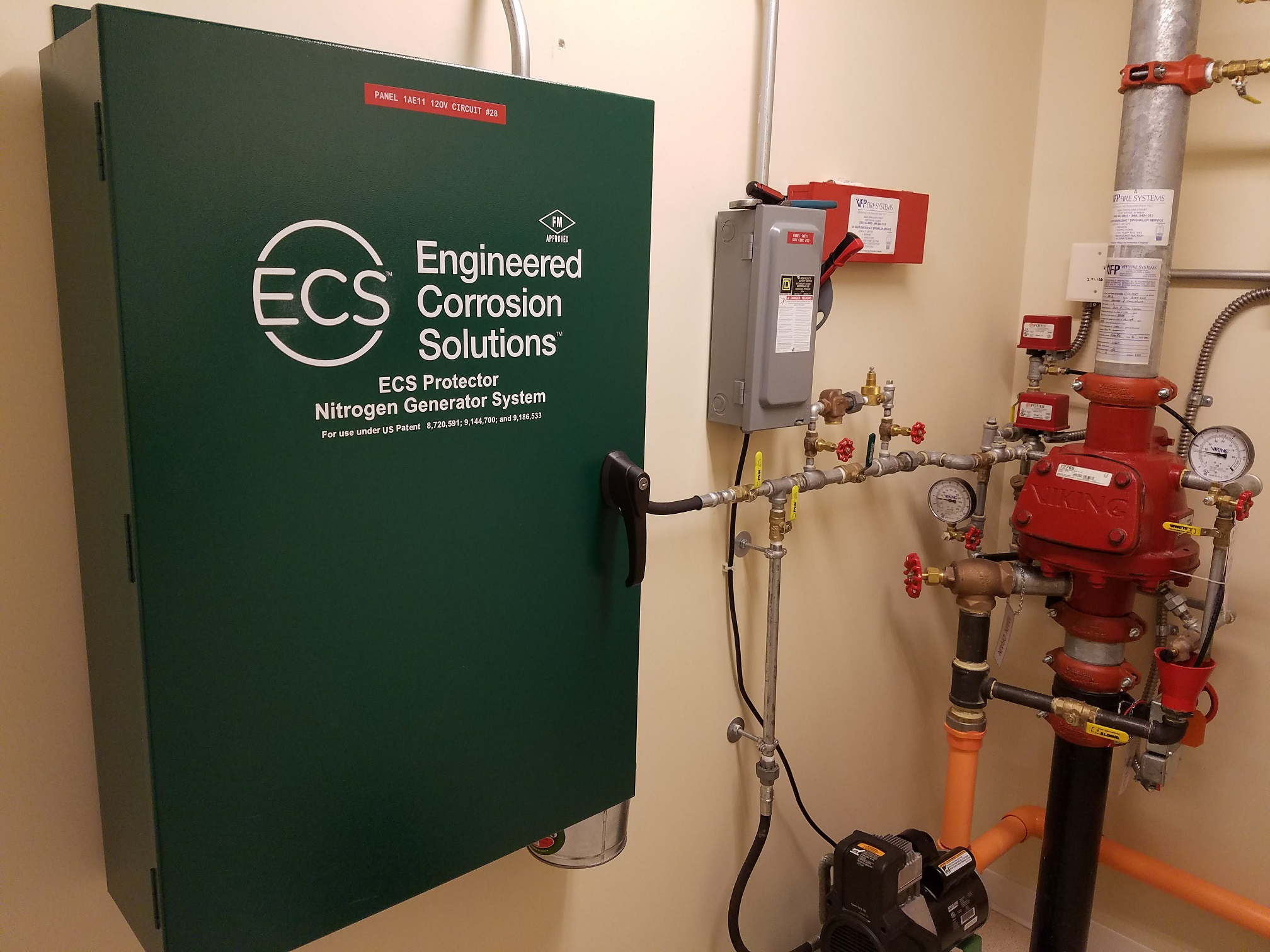
Membrane nitrogen generator providing supervisory gas to dry pipe fire sprinkler system

== See also ==
- Chemical oxygen generator
- Hydrogen production
- Industrial gas
