= Ancora Holdings Group =

Cleveland wealth management firm

Ancora Holdings Group, LLC
- Type: Private
- Industry: Financial services
- Founded: 2003; 23 years ago
- Headquarters: Cleveland, Ohio, US
- Key people: Fred DiSanto (CEO); John Micklitsch (CIO); James Chadwick (president, Ancora Alternatives); John Bartels (president, Private Wealth)
- AUM: $10.5 billion (2025)
- Owner: Focus Financial Partners
- Number of employees: 100
- Website: ancora.net

Ancora Holdings Group LLC is an American wealth management and advisory firm headquartered in Cleveland, Ohio. Founded in 2003, it began as a family wealth and management boutique firm. Ancora is known for activist investing. It has targeted firms like Norfolk Southern Railroad, RB Global, Berry Global, C.H. Robinson, Kohl's, CSX Transportation, US Steel, and Warner Bros. Discovery.

== History ==
Ancora was founded in 2003 with an identity as a “boutique” family wealth and investment management firm. Ancora provides retirement plans, wealth and asset management for individuals, institutions, foundations and families with high net worth through its companies like Ancora Advisors, Ancora Family Wealth Advisors, Ancora Alternatives, Inverness Securities and Ancora Retirement Plan Advisors. In 2024, Ancora had $9.5 billion (US) in assets under management and employed over 100 individuals. Ancora Alternatives, one of the firm's four registered investment advisors, had $1.3 billion (US) in assets under management. In 2022, Ancora nominated nine women and 13 men to boards of companies in which it was invested. Reuters notes that their nominations are "ahead of the industry average" in gender diversity. The company has focused on activist campaigns in the industrial and transportation industries. For example, in 2024-25, it won board seats at Berry Global, a plastic-packaging company and Norfolk Southern, a US railroad.

Since 2004, the company has targeted the industrial and materials area, like used equipment auction house Ritchie Brothers, as well as large box retailers like Bed Bath & Beyond and Kohl’s. In 2018 Ancora entered the freight sector when the organization launched a campaign at Toronto-based Element Fleet Management, one of the world’s largest vehicle leasing and services companies. It pressured trucking company Forward Air to concentrate on its core business, resulting in an almost 100% increase in share value. The company won two board seats at C.H. Robinson and forced out the incumbent CEO. Ancora sometimes uses a strategy of recruiting founders and former executives to initiate its forays into target companies with a focus on share value. In 2026, the company opened two new offices; one in Chicago's Equity Building, the second in the German Village section of Columbus.

=== Leadership ===
Fred DiSanto has served as CEO since 2006 and as chairman since 2014. He is chair of the board of trustees at Case Western Reserve University and former chair and current trustee of the Greater Cleveland Sports Commission. He began in the investment community in 1985 with McDonald & Co. John Micklitsch is the President and Chief Investment Officer. James Chadwick serves as President of the Ancora subsidiary Ancora Alternatives, LLC where he heads the company's activist strategy. John Bartels serves as president of the organizations's Private Wealth Division, as well as sitting on the executive committee.

=== Mergers and acquisitions ===
In 2021, New York's Focus Financial Partners acquired Ancora in an arrangement that provides Focus with better contact with high-net-worth Midwesterners and provides Ancora growth resources like back-office capabilities and enhanced collaboration with other partner firms. Ancora is the 75th “partner firm” connected to Focus and has retained its name, management and autonomy. In 2022, Ancora purchased Alpha Property and Casualty, a licensed insurance agency in Westlake Ohio.

== Activist activities ==
=== Warner Bros. Discovery ===
According to The Wall Street Journal, by February 10, 2026, Ancora subsidiary Ancora Alternatives LLC planned to oppose Warner Brothers' (WBD) sale of its TV and film assets to Netflix.

In February 2026, Ancora threatened to vote ‘no’ on the Netflix purchase, vote 'yes' on the Paramount Skydance (Paramount) purchase, and launch its own proxy fight if the WBD board did not engage with Paramount, who had improved its hostile takeover offer. The WBD board “now has no choice but to deem Paramount’s amended offer as one that could reasonably be expected to result in a Superior Proposal, given Netflix’s presently inferior proposal and unaddressed regulatory issues. Once that happens, the board could then engage in good faith with Paramount to maximize shareholder value, paving the way for WBD to secure an even higher offer. "If the WBD board refuses to do this, Ancora would vote “NO” on the inferior Netflix deal and seek to hold the WBD board accountable,” the firm said in a presentation. “The WBD Board opted to rush into a flawed deal with Netflix rather than earnestly pursue a superior offer from Paramount – in line with the directors’ fiduciary duties,” it said. WBD then said it was considering Paramount’s revised offer, which increased pressure on the board more than Paramount’s previous bids as it appears to address most of WBD's concerns. “Could the WBD Board take Paramount Skydance more seriously? Is this potentially an elegant off-ramp for Netflix?” asked Seaport Research Partners analyst David Joyce. “Paramount Skydance rather materially just addressed most of the WBD board’s concerns with an economically enhanced offer for WBD shares.” Paramount did not raise its $30-a-share cash bid but did inject a new $0.25-per-share so-called “ticking fee” for each quarter its transaction had not closed beyond Dec. 31, 2026. Paramount agreed to fund a $2.8 billion termination fee if WBD terminated its agreement with Netflix and it committed to work with WBD on debt financing costs and obligations.

By February 2026, Ancora had built an approximately $200 million stake in WBD. The investment gave the company a public position to argue that Warner should be sold for maximum shareholder value rather than accepting Netflix’s proposal to acquire the WBD film and television studios and HBO Max streaming service. Ancora did not run an exempt-solicitation campaign urging shareholders to vote against the proposed Netflix deal, like it had for its activist efforts with Norfolk Southern, CSX and others. It argued in shareholder communications that the transaction undervalued the company, presented regulatory and antitrust risks, and would leave investors with shares in a separate cable network company, often referred to as “Discovery Global”, whose valuation and debt levels are uncertain, but are reported to be as much as $17 billion of debt alone. The company was also concerned about whether the Netflix offer would get past regulatory review. Instead, Ancora has called on WBD’s board to reconsider a competing all-cash takeover proposal from Paramount Skydance. Ancora describes that offer, valued at $30 per share for the entire company, including cable assets such as CNN and TNT, as providing clearer terms and potentially facing fewer regulatory challenges than a combination with Netflix.

On 24 February 2026, Paramount upped its bid for the entire Warner Brothers Discovery company to $31 (US) per share; the offer included the previously extended “material adverse effect” clause and the $.25 (US) per share “ticking fee,” or around $81 billion (US) total. WBD’s board considered the offer.

On 27 February 2026, Paramount Skydance won the bidding struggle for Warner Brothers Discovery when Netflix announced it would not match Paramount’s offer and withdrew from the process, a “stunning, come-from-behind” victory for Paramount, according to the WSJ.

=== CSX ===
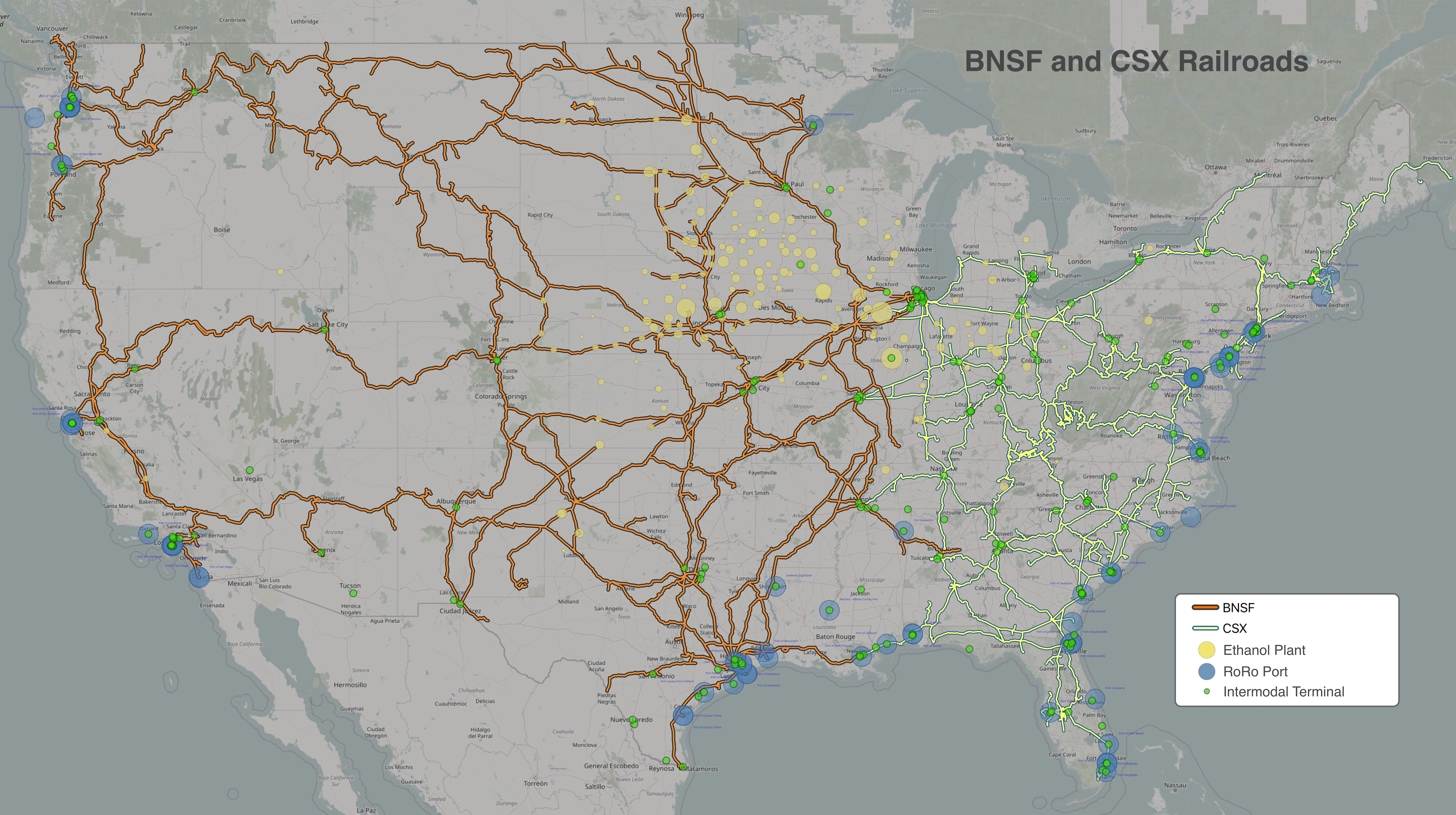
BNSF and CSX railroads

In an August 6, 2025, letter to CSX, Ancora wrote that it was “imperative” for CSX to quickly proceed with merger communications with BNSF or Canadian Pacific Kansas City while asserting that CSX had “anemic stockholder returns,” “disastrous operational performance”, “poor personal selection” of leadership, and that its CEO Joe Hinrichs should be replaced because of claimed financial and operational decline of the railroad, among other claims, even though, since Heinrichs joined CSX in 2022, the railroad had produced the best total shareholder returns among publicly traded Class I railroads. Labor organizations denounced Ancora’s position alleging Ancora would seek short-term profits at the expense of CSX’s long-term health, and Citigroup analyst Ariel Rosa was perplexed by Ancora’s position, criticizing the Ancora letter, among other things, for its timing, misrepresentation of certain facts, statement that CSX faces ‘permanent impairment of value’ if it does not act imminently, suggestion that CSX has not been open to strategic alternatives, and risk of deteriorating CSX’s negotiating position. CSX hired Goldman Sachs to advise it regarding any merger matters.

=== US Steel ===
In late 2023, Japan's Nippon Steel made a $55/share bid for US Steel which was accepted. The bid was worth considerably more than the $35/share bid made by Cleveland-Cliffs earlier that year. At the time of the offer, US Steel had been in decline and had diminished to becoming the US’ smallest steel manufacturer and being dropped from the Dow Jones Industrial Average. In January 2025, US President Biden blocked the sale to Nippon Steel on the grounds of “national security.”

Later that month, Ancora announced a strategy that included a proxy battle, the dismissal of US Steel's CEO and the rejection of legislation to rekindle the Nippon Steel deal. Ancora, it pointed out, was not interested in selling USS but initiating a turnaround in public markets, beginning with naming nine candidates, including Stelco CEO Alan Kestenbaum, to the 12-person US Steel board. Ancora management contended that the USS sale to a foreign firm had hurt USS’ shareholders and that the steel maker had focused on legislative rather than operational and business issues. Ancora proposed that shareholders will unite around Kestenbaum as he would cease payments to Wall Street advisors (est. at nine figures), focus on a recovery strategy and mend relations with steel unions.

In February 2025, US President Donald Trump announced Nippon Steel would be “investing” in US Steel, not purchasing the company outright, without mentioning any details about the investment.

=== Norfolk Southern ===
In 2024, Ancora led a group that invested approximately $1 billion (US) in the Norfolk Southern (NS) railway. Ancora precipitated a proxy fight for seats on the NS board and called for the ouster of NS CEO Alan Shaw. The nominated new directors included former Ohio governor John Kasich and past Kansas City Southern railroad executive Sameh Fahmy. Ancora's takeover campaign referred to the 2023 railroad derailment accident in East Palestine, Ohio (where NS financial liability approaches $1 billion [US]) but was more focused on revising NS’ business strategy to bolster increased profitability and reach fiscal targets. Shareholder advisors Glass Lewis backed Ancora; Institutional Shareholder Services, a similar firm, partially supported NS’ current management. ISS recommended that shareholders vote for eight of NS' endorsed candidates and said Ancora had not proven a change necessary, but had "presented a reasonable path forward." The NS board stood behind the performance of its current leadership. Results of shareholder voting in May 2024 put three of Ancora's nominees on the 13-director NS board. CEO Shaw kept his position. Ancora management vowed to hold Shaw accountable and keep pressuring him for improved profitability. In September 2024, the board of directors hired a law firm to investigate Shaw's “ethical lapses”. Subsequently, Shaw's employment was terminated and he was replaced by CFO Mark R. George.

=== RB Global ===
In November 2022, Toronto-based Ritchie Brothers Auctioneers (now RB Global) announced a $7.3 billion (US) cash and stock buyout deal for US-based IAA Inc. As an investor in IAA, Ancora opposed the pact as not in the IAA shareholders’ best interests, questioning the sale process and the lack of a “go-shop period” when the IAA board could seek a more favorable offer. Ancora, which had advocated the removal of IAA's CEO John Kett, wanted better terms for IAA's stockholders. In early 2023, Ritchie Brothers restructured the agreement by providing more cash to IAA investors and reducing share dilution for Ritchie Brothers shareholders. Ancora supported the merger, opposing hedge fund Luxor Capital Group who said the deal would sidetrack Ritchie Brothers from its core business. Ancora said Luxor was misinformed and its interests were misaligned. Another activist firm, Starboard Value LP invested $500 million in Ritchie Brothers; both Starboard and Ancora will have seats on the RB board. Under the new deal, IAA stockholders received $12.80 per share plus .5252 Ritchie Brothers share for each IAA share. On March 14, 2023, RB shareholders approved the IAA merger.

=== C.H. Robinson ===
In 2022, Ancora began negotiating with C.H. Robinson, the Minnesota-based largest freight broker in the US (revenues in 2022 of $24.7 billion (US)) saying the company should have a clearer focus on Robinson's core domestic business and challenges from newer digitally-oriented participants in the freight industry. Ancora, who had two representatives on the Robinson board at the time also wanted the company to sell its international freight forwarding business. Robinson was struggling with a downturn in the freight business and had laid off 650 employees in an attempt to cut $150 million (US) in expenses. In June 2023, the company appointed 30-year logistics and Ford Motor veteran Dave Bozeman CEO. He also serves on the company's board. In the summer of 2024, Robinson announced it had sold its European Surface Transportation with 6,500 shippers and 15,000 carriers, to German freight forwarder Sennder Technologies which will allow Robinson to focus on its core US business.

=== Berry Global ===
In 2021, Ancora brought pressure on Berry Global of Evansville, Indiana in a letter sent to the company's board of directors. Berry manufactures plastics used in the production of food service containers, bottles and diapers. Ancora's letter suggested Berry should consider strategies to increase its market value like share buy-backs plus leasebacks of corporate-owned real estate. Ancora controlled about 1% of Berry shares at the time. Ancora's letter stated the value of Berry's stock might be as much as $100/share if certain strategies were employed and said it might request a change in the board. Berry responded by initiating an already-approved stock buy-back for $50 million (US), leaving an additional $350 million (US) in the plan. In 2022, Berry announced that it had reached an agreement with Ancora and investor Eminence Capital. Terming the arrangement a “mutual cooperation agreement,” Berry agreed to add three new independent board members plus a capital allocation committee to review overall strategy in increasing market value.

=== Kohl's Corporation ===
In February 2021 a group of activist investors, led by Ancora Alternatives, Macellum Advisors and others, published a letter to shareholders of Kohl's, the retailer based in Menominee Falls, Wisconsin, pointing out the retailer had not performed as well as its competition, lost market share and suffered from a downturn in gross margin. The investors asked for new directors with retail backgrounds, reduced pay for Kohl's executives, revised inventory controls and a sale and lease-back program on property owned by the corporation. Kohl's management rejected the terms of the letter although it admitted it had been in talks with the investment group. In March, Michelle Gass, Kohl's CEO, said she was totally opposed to the proposed lease-back program because of the company's strong investment grade rating and low interest rates. She also was against the new board members, calling their nomination a "power play". The following April, Kohl's, Ancora, Macellum and others reached an agreement, and three new directors were added to the Kohl's board – Margaret Jenkins, former CMO of Denny's, ex-Chicago, Burlington and Quincy Railroad CEO Thomas Kingsbury and past Lululemon CEO Christine Day. Additionally, the board raised its share buy-back program to $2 billion (US). In September 2022, Ancora, acting on its own, requested that the board of directors terminate both CEO Gass and Board Chair Peter Boneparth replacing them with executives more experienced in business turnarounds. In November 2022, Gass announced she would depart Kohl's to become president of Levi Strauss. She was replaced by Ancora's 2021 board nominee, Tom Kingsbury, a former Burlington executive who was named interim CEO.
