= HiddenLevers =

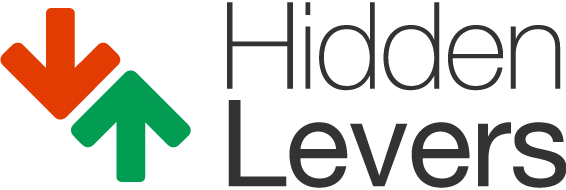
- Company type: Private
- Industry: financial services wealth management asset management fintech business intelligence
- Founded: 2009
- Headquarters: Atlanta, Georgia
- Key people: Raj Udeshi, Founder; Praveen Ghanta, Founder
- Products: Business Intelligence Platform for Wealth Management Investment Proposal Generation Risk Analytics Macro Economic Research
- Number of employees: 24
- Website: http://www.hiddenlevers.com/

HiddenLevers is a financial technology company with headquarters in Atlanta. It provides risk applications and analytics to financial advisors, portfolio managers and executive teams in wealth management. HiddenLevers is also known for its scenario library, a visual compendium of several economic outcomes in the financial zeitgeist, created and updated by the HiddenLevers economic research team. As of April 2019, the company remains self-funded, against a backdrop of record investment in fintech worldwide, hitting $55 billion in 2018, double the year before.

== History ==
HiddenLevers is a fintech company founded by Praveen Ghanta and Raj Udeshi in late 2009. The company aims to provide research, analytics and applications that give life to econometric data. As an outspoken advocate of universal fiduciary duty and more ethical asset management practices, HiddenLevers has received the most traction in the RIA segment of the wealth management industry, where advisors must focus on the best interest of their clients.

In 2010, HiddenLevers got accepted into Mayor Bloomberg's technology incubator, managed by the New York City Economic Development Corporation and NYU-Poly. HiddenLevers debuted its platform at FinovateFall 2010, and since then, the company has been lauded by several financial industry trade publications. Several other fintech applications serving the wealth management and asset management industries have integrations with HiddenLevers, including Orion, Black Diamond, Addepar, Envestnet Tamarac, Advent, eMoney, MoneyGuide Pro, and Morningstar. HiddenLevers was a pioneer in bringing wirehouse-type economic analysis to the RIA market.

In 2015, HiddenLevers launched a new feature giving advisors the ability to create comprehensive investment proposals, which received FINRA review. The investment proposals went beyond traditional analytics to give financial professionals a way to substantiate their recommendations using forward-looking events from HiddenLevers scenario library. Both asset managers and advisors use these proposals for their client-facing activities.

In 2018, HiddenLevers acquired a three building complex in Decatur, Georgia, and shifted its headquarters to Atlanta. That year, the company's economic analysis was recognized by the Federal Reserve of Atlanta. HiddenLevers is now a contributor to the Fed's Beige Book.

In 2019, HiddenLevers re-launched its Risk Monitor platform, used by large RIAs for aggregate risk analytics, as a full-fledged business intelligence platform, with the ability to monitor risk, revenue, and key performance indicators for large wealth management institutions, including RIA consolidators, large broker/dealers, and wirehouse banks. HiddenLevers is now a viable alternative to Blackrock Aladdin and MSCI Risk Metrics at the enterprise level, and is more suitable than either for a fiduciary audience.

As of October 2019, HiddenLevers had over $500 billion of assets on its platform.

In March 2021, HiddenLevers announced its acquisition by Orion Advisor Solutions. At the time of its acquition, HiddenLevers had over $600B in assets on its platform, including assets monitored on behalf of its largest client, Focus Financial.

== See also ==
- Scenario Analysis
- Financial Risk Management
- Risk Modeling
- Stress Testing
