= Yochum =

Yochum is a surname, an Americanized version of the German Joachim. It may refer to the following people:

- Dan Yochum (1950–2020), American player of Canadian football
- Harold L. Yochum (1903–1974), American theologian and church leader
