= Fostoria, Ohio =

- City
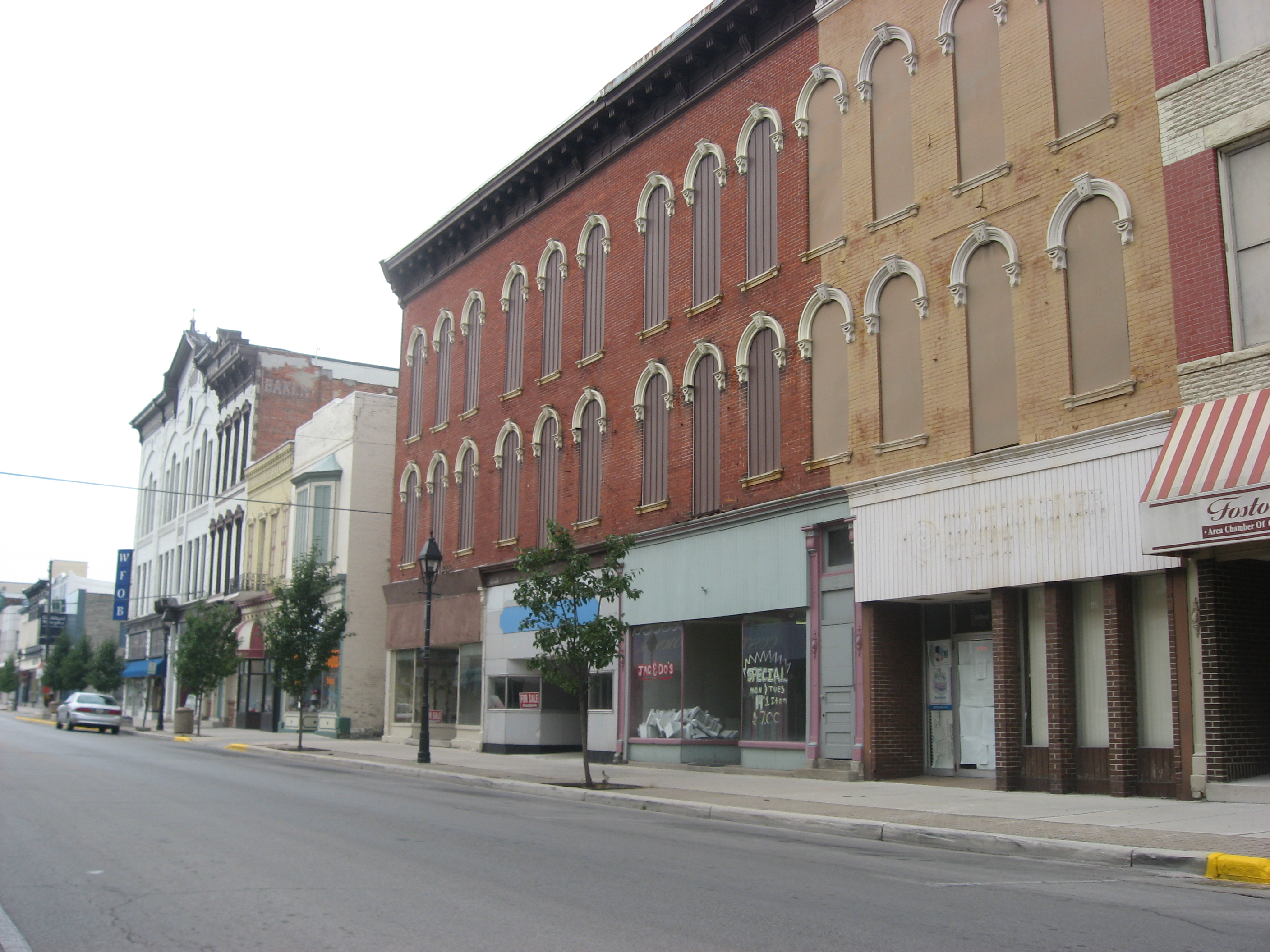
- Main Street in downtown Fostoria

- Flag Seal

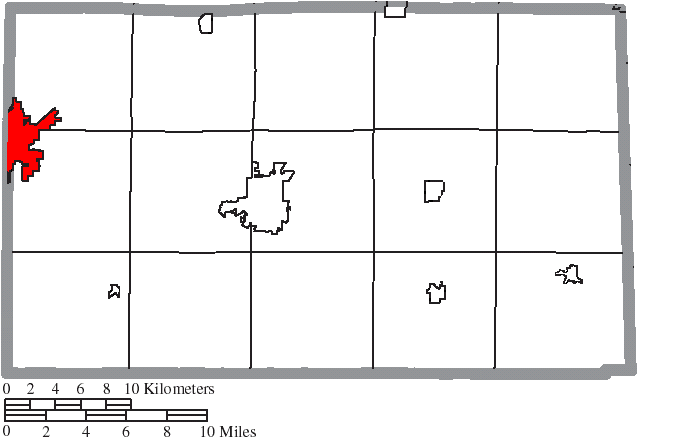
- Location of Fostoria in Seneca County

- Location within Ohio Location within the United States
- Coordinates: 41°09′47″N 83°23′55″W
- Country: United States
- State: Ohio
- Counties: Seneca, Hancock, Wood

Area
  - Total: 7.79 sq mi (20.18 km^{2})
  - Land: 7.58 sq mi (19.62 km^{2})
  - Water: 0.22 sq mi (0.56 km^{2})
- Elevation: 774 ft (236 m)

Population (2020)
  - Total: 13,046
  - Estimate (2023): 13,039
  - Density: 1,722.5/sq mi (665.05/km^{2})
- Time zone: UTC-5 (Eastern (EST))
  - Summer (DST): UTC-4 (EDT)
- ZIP code: 44830
- Area codes: 419, 567
- FIPS code: 39-28014
- GNIS feature ID: 1086945
- Website: fostoriaohio.gov

Fostoria (/fɒsˈtʊəriːə/, foss-TORR-EE-ə) is a city located at the convergence of Hancock, Seneca, and Wood counties in the northwestern part of the U.S. state of Ohio. The population was 13,046 at the 2020 census, slightly down from 13,441 at the 2010 census. It is approximately 40 miles (64 km) south of Toledo and 90 miles (140 km) north of Columbus. The community grew substantially during the end of the 19th century, coinciding with the northwest Ohio gas boom. Typical of Rust Belt cities, Fostoria peaked in size in 1970.

Fostoria was a major site for the glass industry, having over a dozen glass factories during the end of the 19th century. As the area's gas supply became depleted, many of the factories closed or moved. The city is now known for its railroads, as approximately 100 trains pass through the city each day. As a result, the city is often visited by railfans, hosted by a railroad viewing park.

== History ==
Fostoria was created in 1854 with the merger of the communities of Rome and Risdon. The combination of both communities' Methodist churches, on land donated by Charles W. Foster, led to the merger. To show their appreciation for Mr. Foster's generosity, the new community was named Fostoria. Charles W. Foster's son, Charles, became one of Fostoria's most famous citizens—becoming the 35th governor of Ohio and U.S. Secretary of the Treasury under President Benjamin Harrison.

Fostoria is known for its glass heritage and railroads: two CSX main lines and one NS main line intersect in downtown Fostoria, an area called the "Iron Triangle." A natural gas boom in the 1880s, the railroad lines, and recruiting efforts by the community caused Fostoria to become home for numerous glass factories, including the Mambourg Glass Company (the city's first glass factory), the Fostoria Glass Company, the Seneca Glass Company, the Novelty Glass Company, and others.

Although the boom in gas and glass is long over, railroads continue to be important to the community. More than 100 trains pass through Fostoria each day. The Fostoria Railroad Preservation Society, aided by a $815,760 grant from the Ohio Department of Transportation, completed a train viewing park in 2013 to help capitalize on the thousands of railfans who visit yearly.

== Geography ==
According to the United States Census Bureau, the city has a total area of 7.77 square miles (20.12 km^{2}), of which 7.55 square miles (19.55 km^{2}) is land and 0.22 square miles (0.57 km^{2}) is water.

== Demographics ==
Historical population
Census	Pop.	Note	%±
1860	1,027		—
1870	1,733		68.7%
1880	3,569		105.9%
1890	7,070		98.1%
1900	7,730		9.3%
1910	9,597		24.2%
1920	9,987		4.1%
1930	12,790		28.1%
1940	13,453		5.2%
1950	14,351		6.7%
1960	15,732		9.6%
1970	16,037		1.9%
1980	15,743		−1.8%
1990	14,983		−4.8%
2000	13,931		−7.0%
2010	13,441		−3.5%
2020	13,046		−2.9%
2023 (est.)	13,039		−0.1%

=== 2020 census ===
As of the 2020 census, Fostoria had a population of 13,046. The median age was 39.4 years. 24.3% of residents were under the age of 18 and 18.0% of residents were 65 years of age or older. For every 100 females there were 91.1 males, and for every 100 females age 18 and over there were 88.9 males age 18 and over.

99.3% of residents lived in urban areas, while 0.7% lived in rural areas.

There were 5,422 households in Fostoria, of which 29.7% had children under the age of 18 living in them. Of all households, 34.9% were married-couple households, 21.4% were households with a male householder and no spouse or partner present, and 33.0% were households with a female householder and no spouse or partner present. About 33.8% of all households were made up of individuals and 14.3% had someone living alone who was 65 years of age or older.

There were 6,026 housing units, of which 10.0% were vacant. The homeowner vacancy rate was 2.4% and the rental vacancy rate was 9.3%.

Racial composition as of the 2020 census
Race	Number	Percent
White	10,237	78.5%
Black or African American	827	6.3%
American Indian and Alaska Native	38	0.3%
Asian	86	0.7%
Native Hawaiian and Other Pacific Islander	4	0.0%
Some other race	618	4.7%
Two or more races	1,236	9.5%
Hispanic or Latino (of any race)	1,694	13.0%

=== 2010 census ===
As of the census of 2010, there were 13,441 people, 5,417 households, and 3,432 families living in the city. The population density was 1,780.3 inhabitants per square mile (687.4/km^{2}). There were 6,225 housing units at an average density of 824.5 per square mile (318.3/km^{2}). The racial makeup of the city was 84.1% White, 6.4% African American, 0.1% Native American, 0.4% Asian, 4.3% from other races, and 4.7% from two or more races. Hispanic or Latino of any race were 11.5% of the population.

There were 5,417 households, of which 33.0% had children under the age of 18 living with them, 39.1% were married couples living together, 17.3% had a female householder with no husband present, 7.0% had a male householder with no wife present, and 36.6% were non-families. 31.3% of all households were made up of individuals, and 13.7% had someone living alone who was 65 years of age or older. The average household size was 2.42 and the average family size was 2.97.

The median age in the city was 37.9 years. 26% of residents were under the age of 18; 8.3% were between the ages of 18 and 24; 23.9% were from 25 to 44; 25.8% were from 45 to 64; and 16% were 65 years of age or older. The gender makeup of the city was 47.3% male and 52.7% female.

=== 2000 census ===
As of the census of 2000, there were 13,931 people, 5,565 households, and 3,628 families living in the city. The population density was 1,917.6 inhabitants per square mile (740.4/km^{2}). There were 6,024 housing units at an average density of 829.2 per square mile (320.2/km^{2}). The racial makeup of the city was 87.32% White, 5.75% African American, 0.19% Native American, 0.48% Asian, 3.60% from other races, and 2.66% from two or more races. Hispanic or Latino of any race were 7.92% of the population.

There were 5,565 households, out of which 32.0% had children under the age of 18 living with them, 44.9% were married couples living together, 15.1% had a female householder with no husband present, and 34.8% were non-families. 29.6% of all households were made up of individuals, and 12.7% had someone living alone who was 65 years of age or older. The average household size was 2.46 and the average family size was 3.03.

In the city the population was spread out, with 27.0% under the age of 18, 8.8% from 18 to 24, 27.7% from 25 to 44, 20.8% from 45 to 64, and 15.6% who were 65 years of age or older. The median age was 36 years. For every 100 females, there were 90.3 males. For every 100 females age 18 and over, there were 87.0 males.

The median income for a household in the city was $31,166, and the median income for a family was $38,427. Males had a median income of $31,476 versus $22,016 for females. The per capita income for the city was $15,568. About 9.0% of families and 11.2% of the population were below the poverty line, including 14.1% of those under age 18 and 7.0% of those age 65 or over.

== Education ==
The Fostoria Community School District is home to the Fostoria High School.

All portions in Wood County are in the Fostoria district.

== Infrastructure ==
=== Transportation ===
The Fostoria Metropolitan Airport is located two nautical miles (2.3 mi; 3.7 km) northeast of Fostoria's central business district.

Fostoria was served by the Three Rivers Amtrak Service which ran between Chicago and New York City on CSX's B&O line until train service there ended in March 2005. Fostoria station was built at 500 S. Main Street by B&O in 1907.

The city is the site where the Norfolk Southern Railway's ex-Nickel Plate Road mainline crosses the previously mentioned CSX ex-B&O and ex-C&O lines. The three crossings form a triangle, with the site known as the "Iron Triangle." The area is a popular spot for railfans and has a park located in the center between the three mainlines.

=== Public water system ===
The City of Fostoria operates a community public water system that serves a population of approximately 15,000 people and has 5,500 metered service connections. The City of Fostoria also provides water to the Village of Arcadia with a population of 537.

The water treatment system obtains its water from the East Branch of the Portage River. Most of the water is stored in six upground reservoirs. The system also has three groundwater wells that currently serve as the back-up source for the city. Plant design capacity is 6.08 million gallons per day, but current average production is about 2.2 million gallons per day.

== Notable people ==
- Charlie Earl, former Ohio State Representative, Libertarian Party candidate in the 2014 Ohio gubernatorial election
- Charles Foster, son of Fostoria's namesake, former governor of Ohio, former United States Secretary of the Treasury
- Edward R. Hays, soldier, lawyer and politician (Republican) U.S. representative
- Joseph R. Hinrichs, business executive and CEO of CSX Corporation
- Micah Hyde, football player
- Grant Jackson, left-handed pitcher for six MLB teams over eighteen seasons
- Tony Lucadello, baseball scout
- Damon Moore, football player
- John Quinn, art collector
- Gene Sharp, nonviolent action scholar and Nobel Peace Prize Nominee
- Harold L. Yochum, American theologian, church leader and ninth President of Capital University
