= Steve Angel =

American business executive

- Angel in 2026
- Occupation: Business executive
- Employer: CSX Corporation

Steven F. Angel (born 1955, Winston-Salem, North Carolina) is an American business executive who is the current President & CEO of CSX. He currently sits on the board of directors of several major firms operating in space technology and chemical manufacturing.

== Biography ==
=== Business career ===
Angel began his career at General Electric, spending over two decades in various management positions.

From 2007 to 2018, Angel was the chairman, president, and CEO of Praxair. From 2018 to 2022, he was the CEO of Linde plc, overseeing the integration of Linde and Praxair. In 2025, he was appointed to CEO of CSX Corporation, succeeding Joseph R. Hinrichs.

Angel is the non-executive chairman of the GE Vernova board of directors, where he is a member of the Nominating and Governance Committee, additionally serving on the board of directors at GE Aerospace, where he chairs the Management Development and Compensation Committee.

Angel is a member of the board of directors of Stoke Space Technologies, and has previously served as director of PPG Industries, the Hydrogen Council, and the US-China Business Council, and as co-chair of the US-Brazil CEO Forum. Angel is a graduate member of The Business Council, having previously served on its executive committee.

Business positions
Preceded by Joseph R. Hinrichs	CEO of CSX Corporation; 2025–present	Incumbent
