= Joseph R. Hinrichs =

American business executive

- Born: 1966 (age 59–60); Columbus, Ohio, United States
- Education: University of Dayton (BS); Harvard Business School (MBA)
- Occupation: Executive
- Employer: CSX Corporation (former)

Joseph R. Hinrichs (born 1966 in Columbus, Ohio) is an American business executive who is the former president and chief executive officer (CEO) of CSX Corporation. He previously served as president of Ford Motor Company's global automotive business, where he oversaw the Ford and Lincoln brands and managed operations across multiple continents.

Hinrichs began his career as an engineer at General Motors before moving into leadership roles at Ford. He became CEO of CSX in 2022, where his tenure has been marked by mixed financial performance and the ONE CSX initiative that some industry figures have claimed to be ineffective.

== Early life and education ==
Hinrichs was born in 1966 in Columbus, Ohio, United States and grew up in Fostoria, Ohio. He graduated with a Bachelor of Electrical Engineering magna cum laude from the University of Dayton in 1989 and earned an MBA from Harvard Business School in 1994.

== Career ==
In 1989, Hinrichs began working at General Motors as an engineer and subsequently became a plant manager. He worked at Ryan Enterprises Group in Chicago from 1998 to 2000 and later managed Ford's Van Dyke transmission plant in Sterling Heights, Michigan.

Hinrichs subsequently served as president of Ford Motor Company's global automotive business, where he oversaw the Ford and Lincoln brands. Throughout the late 2000s and 2010s, he managed Ford's operations across various continents. At Ford, Hinrichs oversaw about 200,000 employees and 10,000 Ford and Lincoln dealers worldwide. During his tenure, he negotiated four successful contracts with the United Auto Workers while General Motors experienced two strikes in the same period.

Hinrichs retired from Ford in February 2020 at the age of 53, receiving a $5 million bonus. Media reports indicated the departure was linked to a management reorganization after poor fourth-quarter results, and some sources suggested it was not entirely voluntary.

In 2022, he became the president and CEO of CSX Corporation. Through the ONE CSX initiative, he attempted to improve relations with workers, though reactions have been mixed. Some critics described his employee engagement efforts as primarily focused on public relations.

Hinrichs faced major infrastructure challenges during his tenure at CSX, including over $400 million in reconstruction costs in eastern Tennessee following Hurricane Helene, as well as impacts from the Baltimore Key Bridge collapse and other severe weather events.

Under Hinrichs' leadership, CSX reported mixed financial outcomes. In 2024, the company posted a revenue of $14.54 billion, a 0.8% decline from 2023. Operating income fell 5% to $5.25 billion, while net income declined to $3.47 billion ($1.49/share) from $3.67 billion ($1.82/share) the previous year. CSX's stock price reached $37.67 in March 2024, before decreasing to $35.43 in August 2025.

Hinrichs was dismissed as CEO of CSX in September 2025 following pressure from investor Ancora Holdings. The decision followed concerns from the board over his handling of a potential merger with Union Pacific, as well as ongoing tensions about his compensation. Earlier that year, Union Pacific CEO Jim Vena had informally approached Hinrichs about a possible merger between the two railroads. Hinrichs did not pursue the proposal, and Union Pacific later reached an agreement with Norfolk Southern instead. After that deal was announced in July, CSX’s board questioned Hinrichs on the extent of his engagement with Union Pacific and why he had not fully informed them about the approach.

== Affiliations ==
Hinrichs is advisor and board member at companies such as Goodyear, Exide Technologies, Luminar Technologies, microDrive, and First Move Capital. Additionally, he serves on the boards of the US-China Business Council and Climate Leadership Council.

== Recognition ==
In 2015, the governor of Kentucky named Hinrichs as a Kentucky Colonel.
