= Praxair =

American industrial gases company

Praxair, Inc.
- Company type: Subsidiary
- Traded as: NYSE: PX
- Industry: Chemicals
- Founded: 1907; 119 years ago
- Founder: Carl von Linde
- Headquarters: Danbury, Connecticut, United States
- Area served: Worldwide
- Key people: Steve Angel (chairman, president, & CEO)
- Products: Industrial gases
- Revenue: ▲US$11.437 billion (2017)
- Operating income: ▲US$2.448 billion (2017)
- Net income: ▼US$1.237 billion (2017)
- Total assets: ▲US$20.436 billion
- Total equity: ▲US$6.018 billion
- Number of employees: 26,461 (January 2020)
- Parent: Linde plc
- Website: www.praxair.com

Praxair, Inc. was an American worldwide industrial gases company. Founded in 1907, Praxair was the largest industrial gases company in North and South America, and the third-largest worldwide by revenue. In 2018 it merged with Linde AG to form Linde plc. The Praxair name was discontinued on September 1, 2020 in the US.

== History ==
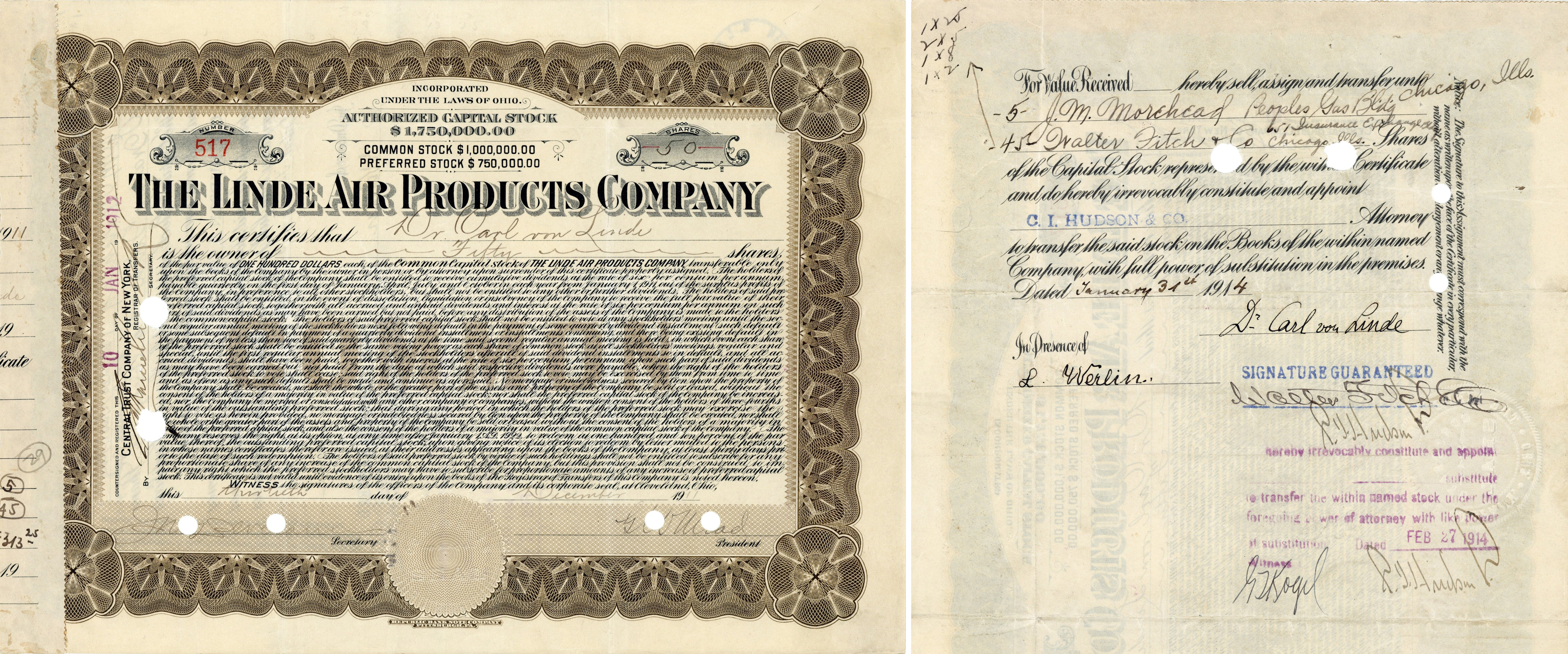
Stock certificate of the Linde Air Products Company, issued on December 13, 1911, registered to Dr. Carl von Linde and endorsed by him in his own hand on the reverse side

The company was founded in Germany by Carl von Linde as Linde Air Products Company in 1907. During the First World War, however, it was confiscated and in 1917, it joined with 4 other chemical companies under the name Union Carbide and Carbon Corporation, while maintaining a separate identity. Its degree of independence waxed and waned over the years, and in 1992, it was spun off as a subsidiary, Union Carbide Industrial Gases Inc., and renamed to Praxair when it became a formally independent company three years later. The name is derived from a combination of the Greek word "praxis", or practical application, and "air", the company's primary raw material.

In August 2016 it was publicly announced that the American Praxair was in official negotiations to merge with the German Linde Group, which would form the world's largest gas supplier. The following month in September negotiations were halted and suspended indefinitely. By mid December 2016 Praxair had resumed negotiations with Linde for a potential merger. In late December 2016 an official announcement was made that Praxair had reached an agreement to merge with Linde in a deal valued at $35 billion with an overall merger value of $65 billion. In April, 2017 Linde again rejected a request, from German private-investor association DSW, for a shareholder vote at its annual general meeting in May. Nonetheless in May 2017, both companies reached a deal, in principle, for an all-share merger of equals valued at $75 billion, to form a new holding company. In early June 2017, both companies agreed to the merger. US regulatory approval was obtained in October 2018, after which the financial transaction was completed. As part of this merger, Praxair's European business was sold to Taiyo Nippon Sanso and rebranded Nippon Gases Europe. Upon completion of merger, it formed a new American German company Linde plc domiciled in Ireland and headquartered in Surrey for tax purposes.

== Gallery ==
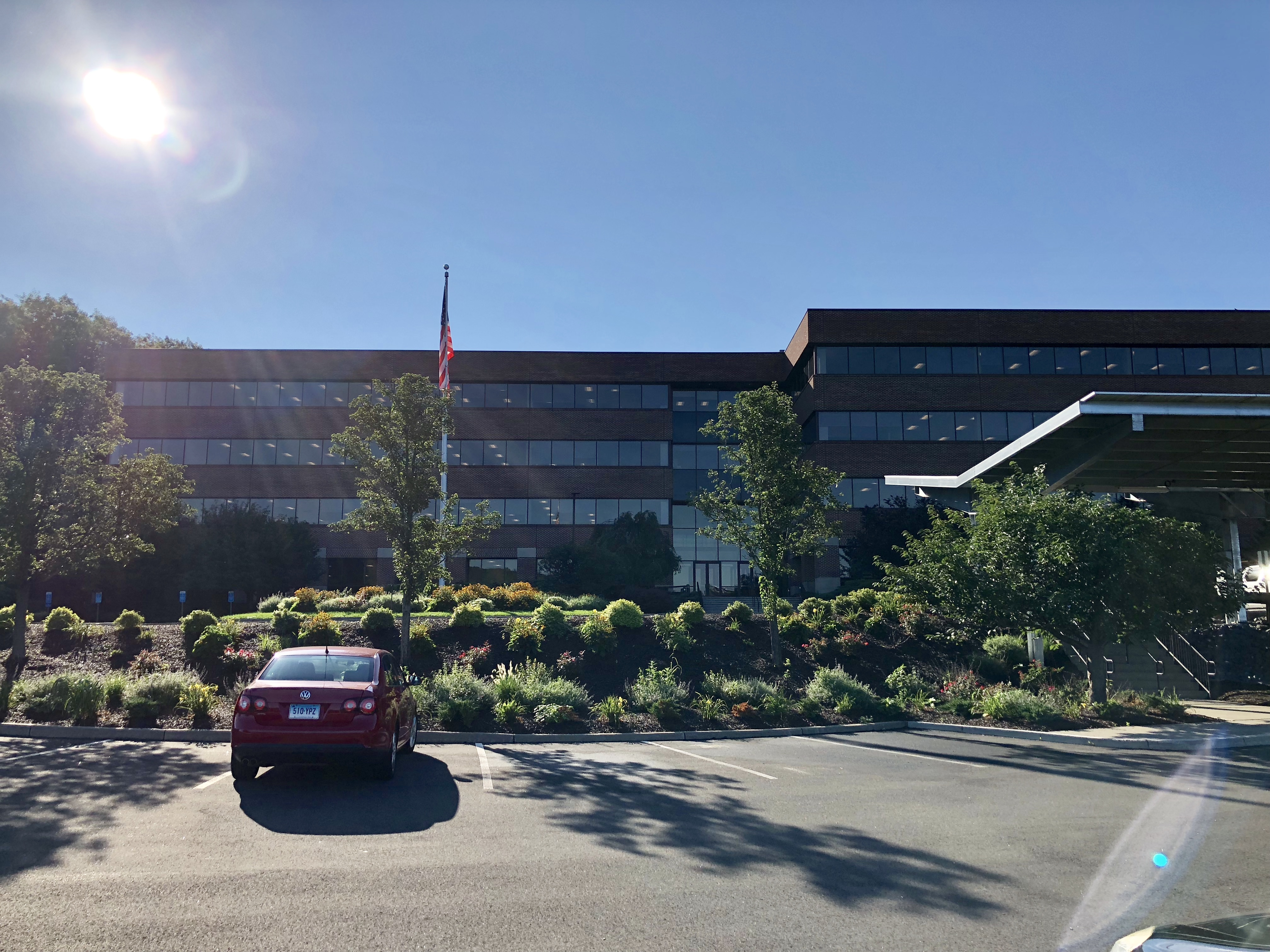
Praxair headquarters in Danbury, CT

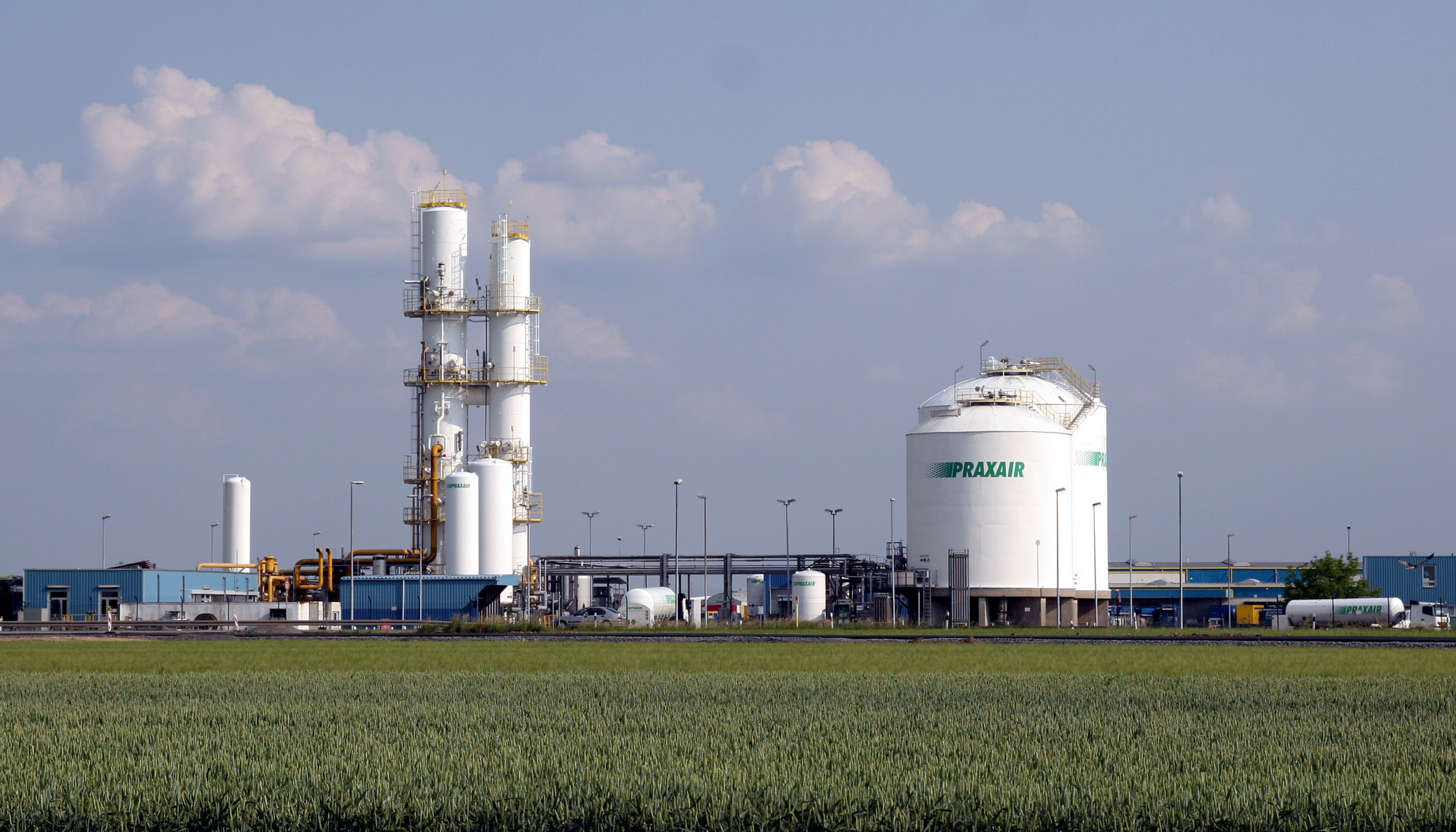
Praxair plant in Biebesheim, Germany, 6 June 2008

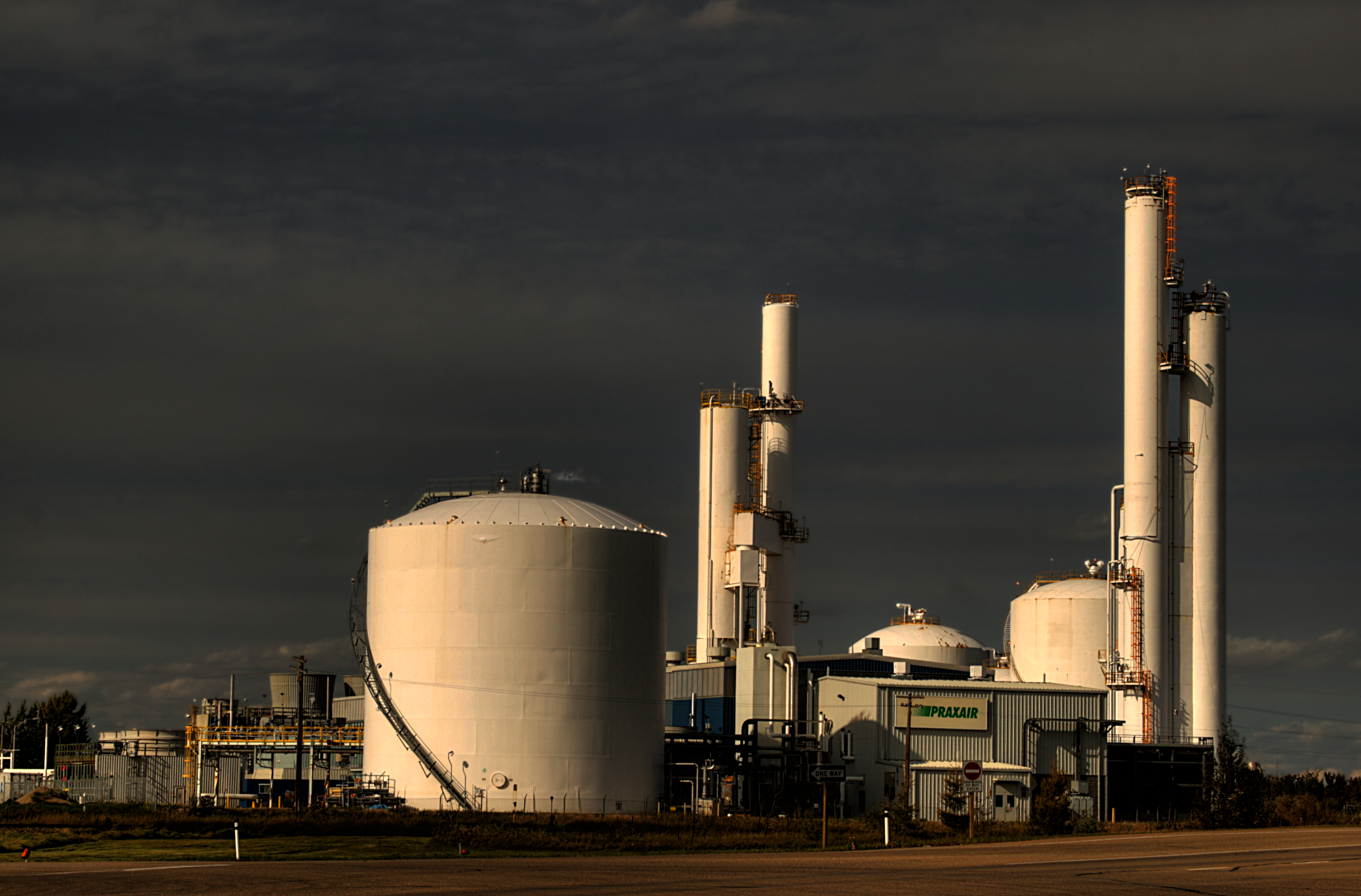
The Praxair plant in Fort Saskatchewan, Canada, 15 September 2012

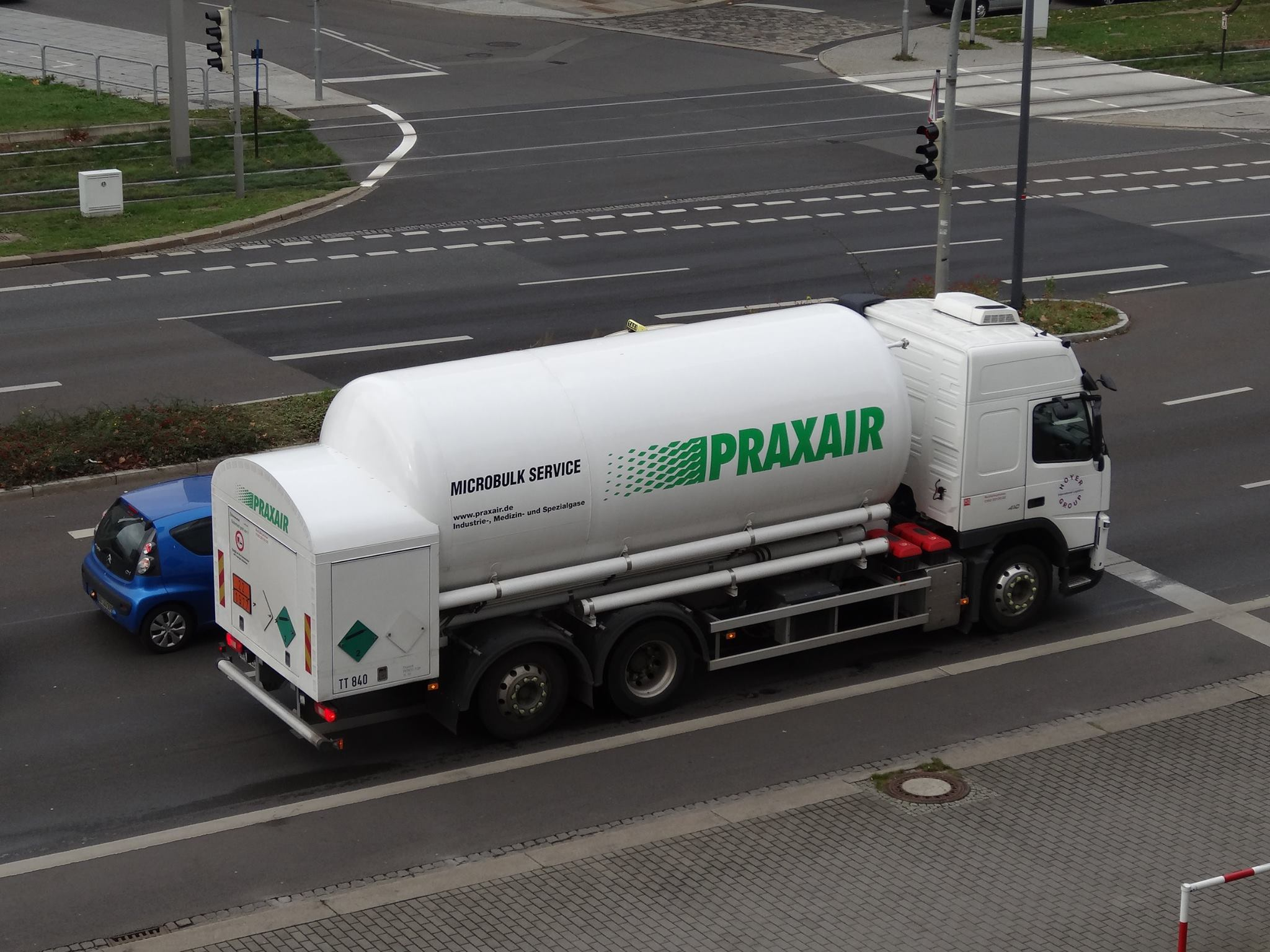
Praxair truck in Dresden, Germany, 5 November 2013
