= Euro Auctions =

Euro Auctions is a Northern Ireland auction house that buys and sells industrial plant, construction equipment and agricultural machinery worldwide. Euro Auctions was founded in 1998 in Dromore, County Tyrone, by Derek Keys and his brothers.

In August 2021, its sale to Canada's Ritchie Bros. Auctioneers for £775 million was announced. The sale was called off in April 2022 due to no realistic prospect of approval by the UK competition watchdog, the Competition and Market Authority (CMA).

Currently, the company continues as a Leading Independent Global Auctioneer of Heavy Equipment.
