= Rudy Adolf =

Austrian-American businessman

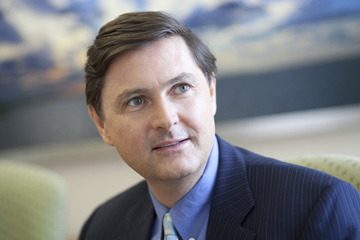
- Born: Innsbruck, Austria
- Occupations: CEO, Focus Financial Partners
- Years active: 1987 - present

Ruediger "Rudy" Adolf is an Austrian-born American business executive. He is the founder, chief executive officer and chairman of Focus Financial Partners.

In July 2018, Adolf took Focus Financial public, offering over 16 million shares of the firm's Class A common stock. The IPO gathered a total of $615.4 million in gross proceeds. The stock increased 14% on its first day of trading on the NASDAQ Stock Market.

== Early life ==
Adolf was born in Innsbruck, Tyrol, Austria. Adolf's interest in financial services began at an early age, thanks to exposure to his father's work as the owner of a local accounting firm. Adolf graduated from the University of Innsbruck, Austria with a Doctor and Magister of Jurisprudence degree.

== Business background ==
Adolf began his career at his family's CPA firm. In 1987, he relocated to Munich, Germany to work for the global consulting firm McKinsey & Company. In 1990, he moved to the United States, where he was named partner at McKinsey.

In 1998, Adolf joined American Express as the SVP Strategy and Business Development, reporting to CEO Harvey Golub. Adolf was then appointed SVP and general manager of the American Express Global Brokerage and Banking division.

== Focus Financial Partners ==
In 2004, Adolf incorporated Focus Financial Partners with his former colleagues from American Express, Rajini Kodialam and Lenny Chang. Focus Financial's stated goal was to support independent RIA firms.

Following an investment in July 2017 by private equity firms Stone Point Capital and KKR, Focus was valued at over $2 billion. Focus’ IPO in July 2018 valued the firm at an enterprise value of $3.5 billion. As of August 2018, Focus has partnered with approximately 60 wealth management firms in the U.S., Australia, Canada and the U.K.

Adolf has been featured on several lists of influential people in the industry. In 2017, Adolf was named to the list of Icons & Innovators by InvestmentNews, honoring visionaries who have shaped and transformed the financial advice profession. In 2006 during Focus’ inception, Wealth Management magazine named him one of its annual "Ten to Watch." He was also named to Investment Advisor magazine's fifth annual IA 25 in 2007 He has been featured in The Wall Street Journal, The New York Times, CNBC, Bloomberg Businessweek, and a 2014 Harvard Business School Case Study.

== Fintech Investment ==
Under Adolf's guidance, in June 2018, Focus invested in New York-based FinTech company SmartAsset's series C funding totaling $28 million, along with Javelin Venture Partners, TTV Capital, IA Capital and Citi Ventures among others. Adolf stated that he sees “a scalable approach to digital client acquisition” as “an important lever for the wealth management industry.”

== Personal life ==
Adolf resides in West Palm Beach with his wife and their three children, Isabel, Marcus, and Conrad.
