= List of CSX Transportation predecessor railroads =

CSX Transportation's system map as of 2009

The following railroads merged to form CSX Transportation.

- The Seaboard System Railroad merged with Chessie System which consisted of the Baltimore and Ohio Railroad and Chesapeake and Ohio Railway and Western Maryland Railroad to form CSX Transportation July 1, 1986.
  - The Seaboard Coast Line Railroad merged with the Louisville and Nashville Railroad and others to form the Seaboard System Railroad December 29, 1982.
    - The Atlantic Coast Line Railroad merged with the Seaboard Air Line Railroad to form the Seaboard Coast Line Railroad July 1, 1967.
      - The Charleston and Western Carolina Railway merged into the Atlantic Coast Line Railroad December 31, 1959.
    - The Seaboard Air Line Railroad merged with the Atlantic Coast Line Railroad to form the Seaboard Coast Line Railroad July 1, 1967.
    - The Piedmont and Northern Railway merged into the Seaboard Coast Line Railroad July 1, 1969.
  - The Louisville and Nashville Railroad merged with the Seaboard Coast Line Railroad and others to form the Seaboard System Railroad December 29, 1982.
    - The Nashville, Chattanooga and St. Louis Railway merged into the Louisville and Nashville Railroad August 30, 1957.
    - The Monon Railroad merged into the Louisville and Nashville Railroad July 31, 1971.
  - The Georgia Railroad merged into the Seaboard System Railroad in 1983.
- The Chesapeake and Ohio Railway merged into CSX Transportation August 31, 1987.
  - The Baltimore and Ohio Railroad merged into the CSX Transportation August 31, 1987.
    - The Western Maryland Railway merged with others to form CSX July 1, 1986.
  - The Pere Marquette Railway merged into the Chesapeake and Ohio Railway June 6, 1947.
- The Richmond, Fredericksburg and Potomac Railroad, which was majority-owned by CSX, merged into CSX Transportation in 1991.
- The Pittsburgh and Lake Erie Railroad, of which part had been used by the Baltimore and Ohio Railroad, sold that portion to CSX Transportation in 1991. On September 11, 1992, CSX Transportation bought the rest through the Three Rivers Railway.
- Atlanta and West Point Railroad
- Baltimore and Ohio Chicago Terminal Railroad
- Chessie System
- Clinchfield Railroad
- New York, New Haven and Hartford Railroad merged with Pennsylvania Railroad and New York Central Railroad to form Penn Central
- Western Railway of Alabama
- Pennsylvania Railroad
- New York Central
- Penn Central Transportation Company
- Erie Railroad merged with Delaware, Lackawanna and Western to from Erie Lackawanna
- Delaware, Lackawanna and Western Railroad merged with Erie Railroad to form Erie Lackawanna
- Erie Lackawanna Railway
- Lehigh Valley Railroad
- Reading Company
- Central Railroad of New Jersey
- Lehigh and Hudson River Railway
- Pennsylvania-Reading Seashore Lines
- Monongahela Railroad
- Conrail
- Chicago and Eastern Illinois Railroad Merged into Louisville and Nashville in 1976

A family tree of Conrail, CSX Transportation, and Norfolk Southern Railway. Links are clickable.
