= Harold L. Yochum =

American theologian

- Born: Harold Leland Yochum; June 7, 1903; Fostoria, Ohio
- Died: September 1, 1974 (aged 71); Columbus, Ohio
- Education: Capital University (BA 1923); Ohio State University (MA 1924); Evangelical Lutheran Theological Seminary (DD 1928)
- Religion: Lutheranism
- Church: American Lutheran Church
- Ordained: 1928
- Congregations served: Emmanuel Lutheran Church, Hessville, Ohio (1928-1934); Holy Trinity Lutheran Church, Detroit, Michigan (1934-1939)
- Offices held: President, ALC Michigan District (1937-1946); President, Capital University (1945-1969)

Harold Leland Yochum (June 7, 1903 - September 1, 1974) was an American theologian, church leader, and the ninth president of Capital University in Columbus, Ohio, United States. He was installed as its president on October 24, 1946, and served until his retirement in 1969.

== Life and career ==
Yochum was born on June 7, 1903, in Fostoria, Ohio. to William H. Yochum and Ida (Heiserman).

After graduating from Capital University in 1923 and then earning a master's degree from Ohio State University in 1924, he became a teacher and high school principal in Attica, Ohio, from 1924 to 1925. From 1925 to 1928 he taught Latin and English at Capital University. He obtained his Bachelor of Divinity degree from the Evangelical Lutheran Theological Seminary in Columbus, Ohio, in 1928.

In 1943, he obtained his Doctor of Divinity degree from Capital University. He served as pastor of Emmanuel Lutheran Church in Hessville, Ohio, from 1928 to 1934 and pastor of Holy Trinity Lutheran Church in Detroit, Michigan, from 1934 to 1939. He was also a former president of the Michigan District of the American Lutheran Church (ALC) from 1937 to 1946. Yochum was elected vice president of the ALC, a commissioner to the National Lutheran Council, and president of the American Lutheran Conference. He wrote extensively for the church papers and published two books of sermons. Honorary Doctorate of Humane Letters degrees were awarded from Central State College (1959), Pacific Lutheran University (1960), Denison University (1969), and Ashland College (1970).

In August 1948, Yochum was appointed a delegate of the American Lutheran Church to the World Council of Churches in Amsterdam, where his travels included England, Norway, Sweden, Denmark, and Germany. The board of regents provided trips for him and his wife to Europe in the summer of 1962 accompanying the chapel choir, and in 1966, to the Holy Land to celebrate his twentieth year of service to the university as president.

In June 1967, the Yochums journeyed to Europe to celebrate the 450th anniversary of the Reformation. They traveled to Eisleben, Wittenberg, and the Wartburg Castle, and on to Athens, Corinth, and Ephesus.

On July 5, 1928, he married Agatha Amelia Pfeiffer and subsequently had three daughters: Doris, Marilyn and Faith. In the summers they enjoyed being at the family cottage, Cedar Haven, in the Les Cheneaux Islands of northern Michigan.

== Death ==
Yochum died on September 1, 1974, in Columbus, Ohio.
