= Michelle Gass =

American businesswoman (born 1968)

- Born: 1968 (age 57–58); Maine, United States
- Education: Worcester Polytechnic Institute (BS); University of Washington (MBA)
- Title: CEO of Levi Strauss & Co.
- Spouse: Scott Gass (m. 1994)
- Children: 2

Michelle D. Gass (nee Petkers, born 1968) is an American businesswoman who is the CEO of Levi Strauss & Co. She previously was CEO of department store Kohl's.

== Education and career ==
Gass earned a bachelor's degree in chemical engineering from Worcester Polytechnic Institute in 1990 and an MBA from the University of Washington.

She joined consumer goods company Procter and Gamble in 1990, where she worked in product development, before moving to Starbucks in 1996 as manager of its Frappuccino blended iced coffee brand. At Starbucks, she was credited with turning Frappuccino into a $2 billion business, and her other company work included growing the company's Seattle's Best brand, now owned by Nestlé, and later led the retailer's expansion in Europe as Starbucks' EMEA president.

In 2013, Gass joined department store Kohl's as chief customer officer, and in 2015 became the company's chief merchandising and customer officer. In 2017, she was promoted to CEO-elect. In May 2018, Gass officially became Kohl's CEO. In 2018, Gass was named to Fortune magazine's list of most powerful women. She was also named to Fortune's 2018 Businesssperson of the Year list. In 2019, the National Retail Federation named Gass as the recipient of its Visionary 2020 award, awarded to the nation's top retail executive. In 2019, Gass was elected to the board of directors of PepsiCo.

In November 2022, it was announced that Gass would be stepping down as Kohl's CEO by early December to become the CEO-in-waiting for Levi Strauss & Co. After one year as president of the Levi’s brand, she became the CEO of Levi Strauss & Co. in early 2024.

In May 2025, Gass delivered the undergraduate Commencement address at Worcester Polytechnic Institute, where she was granted an honorary doctorate.

Gass is a member of The Business Council.

== Personal life ==
Gass was born and raised in Lewiston Maine. She married Scott Gass on August 20, 1994. They have two children.
