= Focus Financial Partners =

U.S. financial services company

Focus Financial Partners Inc.
- Type: Private
- Traded as: Nasdaq: FOCS
- Industry: Wealth management
- Founded: 2004; 22 years ago
- Founders: Rudy Adolf; Rajini Kodialam; Lenny Chang
- Headquarters: New York City
- Owners: Clayton, Dubilier & Rice; (2023–present); Stone Point Capital; (2017–present); Kohlberg Kravis Roberts; (2017–2023)
- Website: focusfinancialpartners.com

Focus Financial Partners Inc. is an American company that invests in independent, fiduciary wealth management firms, being listed on the Nasdaq under the ticker symbol FOCS. Headquartered in New York City, it was incorporated in 2004 by Ruediger (Rudy) Adolf, Rajini Kodialam and Leonard (Lenny) Chang.

As of 2018, Focus has offices in both New York and San Francisco, and approximately 60 partner firms across the United States, Australia, Canada and the United Kingdom. The partnership comprises over 2,700 wealth-management-focused principals and employees.

On August 31, 2023, Clayton, Dubilier & Rice completed the acquisition of Focus Financial Partners. Even with the sale, valued at more than 7 billion dollars, Stone Point Capital remains a minority shareholder in the company.

== Overview ==
When Focus made its IPO in July 2018, The Wall Street Journal said the company's public offering was the "first opportunity for stock investors to get in on the booming market for independent financial advice.” It was also described as “a bellwether that could open the door to liquidity for RIAs,” by Barron's and “a watershed moment for the RIA space,” by WealthManagement.

According to news reports, it has been one of the leaders in the shift of financial advisors from wire house broker dealers to registered investment advisers (RIAs). For the year ended December 31, 2017, Focus revenue exceeded $660 million, over 90% of which was fee-based and recurring in nature. it has been named six times to Inc. magazine's list of the 5000 fastest-growing private companies in America (most recently in 2017).

In July 2017, three months before a deal was closed, it reported that an investor group led by Stone Point Capital and Kohlberg Kravis Roberts (KKR) had acquired a majority stake in the company, valuing Focus at approximately $2 billion. Later, in September 2023, six months after agreeing to go private again, Focus was acquired by Clayton, Dubilier & Rice in an all-cash deal valued at over $7 billion, with Stone Point Capital retaining its stake.

== History ==
Adolf said of the company's founding that "We saw tens of thousands of independent firms out there, without good succession planning and handicapped by their small size. They were doing well, but could do better if they had some of the benefits of a big organization behind them without compromising their entrepreneurial independence and spirit."

Having reached a total of 14 partner firms in October 2007, Focus began to expand internationally the following year with the addition of England's Greystone Financial Services Ltd. and the introduction of Focus Independence, a program created to "help elite advisors fully realize their entrepreneurial potential". In 2009, Polaris Venture Partners and Summit Partners provided Focus with $50 million of new capital.

Continuing to grow, Focus closed a $220 million credit facility in January 2012, making its access to credit "unique in the RIA industry." In 2013, the company received an additional $216 million strategic equity investment from Centerbridge and in 2014 expanded to a $550 million credit facility.

Two years after arriving in Canada through Dorchester Wealth Management and the announcement of the US$1 billion credit facility, it arrived in Australia in 2017 through an investment in Financial Professionals, allowing Focus to have 40 partner firms. In May, it announced that SCS Financial and its subsidiary, SCS Capital Management, an independent registered investment advisory firm based in Boston, Massachusetts and New York, New York, entered into a definitive agreement to join the Focus partnership, the largest deal in Focus' history.

In April 2017, it announced that an investor group, led by SPC and KKR would acquire a majority stake in the company, valuing Focus at approximately $2 billion. Fifteen months later, when it offered 16 million shares of the firm's Class A common stock., Focus collected a total of 615.4 million dollars from its IPO - on the first day alone, the stock jumped 14% on its first day of trading on the NASDAQ Stock Market.

In December 2020, RIA Intel reported that Focus planned to create its own RIA firm called Connectus Wealth Advisers.

In September 2021, Focus acquired wealth management and advisory firm, Ancora Holdings Group, in an arrangement that provides Focus with better contact with high-net-worth Midwesterners and provides Ancora growth resources like back-office capabilities and enhanced collaboration with other partner firms. Ancora is the 75th “partner firm” connected to Focus and has retained its name, management and autonomy.

== Business model ==
Focus invests in Registered Investment Advisers (RIAs) and helps large investment-management teams leaving brokerage houses to start their own independent firms within the Focus partnership (through the Focus Independence program).

The Wall Street Journal notes that Focus partner firms maintain their entrepreneurial independence while they benefit from the synergies, scale, economics and best practices of a market leader to help them achieve their business objectives. As Rudy Adolf describes the process, "First and foremost, the selling RIA retains operating autonomy through the management company, because we believe in never turning a successful entrepreneur into an employee."

== Key personnel ==
Ruediger (Rudy) Adolf, Founder and chief executive officer

Prior to joining Focus in 2004, Adolf was Senior Vice President and General Manager of the Global Brokerage and Banking division of American Express. Before that, he was a partner at McKinsey & Company in New York, primarily focusing on financial services firms. He began his career with McKinsey in Munich.

Adolf has been featured on several lists of the most influential people of his industry: eleven years after being named its "Ten to Watch" by Wealth Management magazine, he was included in the list of Icons & Innovators by InvestmentNews. This list honors visionaries who have shaped and transformed the financial advice profession.

Rajini Kodialam, co-founder and Managing Director

Kodialam was a vice president at American Express in New York, where she managed the overall online experience for the U.S. Consumer Card and Travel businesses. Kodialam was previously at McKinsey & Company in New York, specializing in consumer financial services firms.

Leonard (Lenny) Chang, co-founder and Managing Director

Prior to Focus, Lenny Chang was with the Boston Consulting Group, where he worked on a range of assignments for institutional asset management and financial brokerage firms. He previously worked at American Express in the Strategy and Business Development Group.
