= RB Global =

North American industrial auctioneer

RB Global, Inc.
- Formerly: Ritchie Bros. Auctioneers Incorporated
- Type: Public company
- Traded as: NYSE: RBA; S&P 400 component; TSX: RBA
- ISIN: CA7677441056
- Industry: Auctions & Industrial products distribution
- Founded: Kelowna, British Columbia, Canada
- Founder: David Edward Ritchie
- Headquarters: Westchester, Illinois, U.S.
- Key people: Erik Olsson (Chairman); Jim Kessler (CEO)
- Revenue: ▲US$4.59 billion (2025)
- Net income: ▲US$428 million (2025)
- Number of employees: 7,900+
- Website: rbglobal.com

Ritchie Bros. Auctioneers (RBA), or simply Ritchie Bros., is a publicly traded company legally domiciled in Canada with headquarters in Westchester, Illinois. Its common shares are traded on the Toronto Stock Exchange and the New York Stock Exchange.

== History ==
=== The Ritchie Brothers ===
Ritchie Bros. Auctioneers was established in Kelowna, British Columbia, Canada, when the three Ritchie brothers – Ken, John and Dave Ritchie – took over the OK Used Furniture Store from their father in 1955. They entered the auction business in 1958.

The brothers began conducting auctions more regularly and in 1958 incorporated Ritchie Bros. Auction Galleries Ltd. to formalize their new business. Ritchie Bros. began selling used equipment in the 1960s. In 1963 Dave Ritchie moved to Vancouver, B.C. and rented an auction site on S.E. Marine Drive. He set up the company's first equipment auction in Vancouver shortly after.

=== The early auction years ===
Most of the company's earliest auctions were held in British Columbia. Ritchie Bros. began expanding into other parts of Canada in the mid-1960s, conducting its first auctions in Alberta (in 1964), the Yukon (1964), Saskatchewan (1965), Manitoba (1968), and other parts of Eastern Canada shortly thereafter.

In 1965, Ken Ritchie left the company to spend more time with his family and the company's name was changed from Ritchie Bros. Auction Galleries Ltd. to Ritchie Bros. Auctioneers Ltd. Ken established his own auction company, but returned to work with his brothers in 1968. He stayed with Ritchie Bros. Auctioneers until 1980.

In 1968, Ritchie Bros. Auctioneers held its first auction with gross proceeds in excess of CA$1 million, in Edmonton, Alberta, Canada. Edmonton was also the site of the company's first permanent auction site (on company-owned land), which was established in 1976. Until then, Ritchie Bros. had been conducting its auctions on leased land.

=== Expansion in the U.S. ===
Ritchie Bros. established its first presence outside Canada in 1969 when it became incorporated in Washington, USA. The company held its first auction outside Canada in 1970, in Beaverton, Oregon, and gradually began expanding throughout the United States.

In 1974, John Ritchie left the company, selling his share of the business to his brother Dave. In 1975, Dave Ritchie – the sole company shareholder – sold partnerships in Ritchie Bros. Auctioneers to some of his key employees.

=== International expansion ===
In the late 1980s, Ritchie Bros. Auctioneers began to look overseas for further growth opportunities, in the UK and the Netherlands, and then in Australia and other countries.

=== Going public ===
In 1998, the year that Ritchie Bros. went public, the company's annual gross auction proceeds exceeded US$1 billion for the first time ever. Its common shares were listed on the New York Stock Exchange under the symbol RBA in March 1998, followed by listing on the Toronto Stock Exchange in April 2004.

Since then, Ritchie Bros. has added auction sites in eight other countries. Today, the company has 40+ auction sites worldwide.

=== Acquisitions ===
In 1999, Ritchie Bros. acquired Forke Brothers, an equipment auction company based in Nebraska, USA and one of its major competitors. The company moved its U.S. headquarters to Lincoln, Nebraska following the acquisition. Ritchie Bros. made its foray into the agricultural equipment auction business with the acquisitions of All Peace Auctions of Grande Prairie, Alberta, Canada in 2002; LeBlanc Auction Service of Estevan, Saskatchewan, Canada in 2004; Dennis Biliske Auctioneers of Buxton, North Dakota, USA in 2006; Clarke Auctioneers of Rouleau, Saskatchewan, Canada in 2007; and Martella Auction Company of Tipton, CA in 2009. In February Ritchie Bros. acquired a used heavy equipment listing service, Mascus. In August 2016, the company announced its plan to acquire IronPlanet, Inc., an online auction company. The deal was approved by the DOJ and closed in May 2017. In 2016, Ritchie Bros. also acquired Petrowsky Auctioneers based in Franklin, CT and Kramer Auctions, a Canadian agricultural auction company based in North Battleford, SK. In 2018, Ritchie Bros. acquired Leake Auction Company, an Oklahoma-based collector car auctioneer. In August 2021, the acquisition of Euro Auctions, a Northern Ireland auction house that buys and sells industrial plant, construction equipment, and agricultural machinery for £775 million was announced. That acquisition attempt was discontinued in April 2022. In March 2023, Ritchie Bros. completed the acquisition of U.S. auto retailer IAA Inc. in a stock and cash deal worth $7 billion. It was announced in May 2023 a new name for the parent company, RB Global.

== Brand portfolio ==
This is a list of companies and platforms owned and operated by RB Global.

Name	Acquired/Founded	Notes
Ritchie Bros. Auctioneers	1958	Global leader in asset disposition and industrial auctions. RB Global’s foundational brand.
TruckPlanet	2013	Online marketplace for commercial trucks, part of the IronPlanet family.
GovPlanet	2014	Online marketplace specializing in government and military surplus equipment.
Mascus	2016	Leading global online equipment listing service, acquired by RB in Feb 2016.
IronPlanet	2017	Online heavy-equipment marketplace, acquired by Ritchie Bros. in 2017.
IAA, Inc.	2023	Digital marketplace for salvage and damaged vehicle auctions; acquisition completed in March 2023.
Boom & Bucket	2024	Digital-first marketplace for used construction equipment, acquired October 31, 2024.

== Operations ==
In 2022, Ritchie Bros. reported US$6 billion in total Gross Transactional Value (GTV).

=== Management ===
Jim Kessler was appointed Ritchie Bros.' CEO after the departure of Ann Fandozzi in December 2023 due to a dispute over equity compensation. The company also fired its CFO Eric Jacobs. Other notable management team members at Ritchie Bros. include Matt Ackley (Chief Digital Officer), Carmen Thiede (Chief Transformation & People Officer), Jeff Jeter (Chief Revenue Officer), Baron Concors (Chief Product & Technology Officer), Kevin Geisner (Chief Strategy Officer), and Darren Watt (Chief Legal Officer).
