= Yupo (manufacturer) =

Japanese paper manufacturer

Yupo Corporation
- Company type: Corporation
- Industry: Paper, pulp
- Founded: May 25, 1970
- Headquarters: Tokyo, Japan Chiyoda-ku Kanda Surugadai 3-4 Shin-Ochanomizu Building 15th floor
- Key people: Shinji Watanabe (president)
- Products: Synthetic paper
- Net income: 1,355 million yen (2019)
- Total assets: 495 million yen
- Total equity: 20,712 million yen (2019)
- Owners: Mitsubishi Chemical Corporation 50% Oji Holdings 50%
- Number of employees: 349 (2024)
- Website: yupousa.com

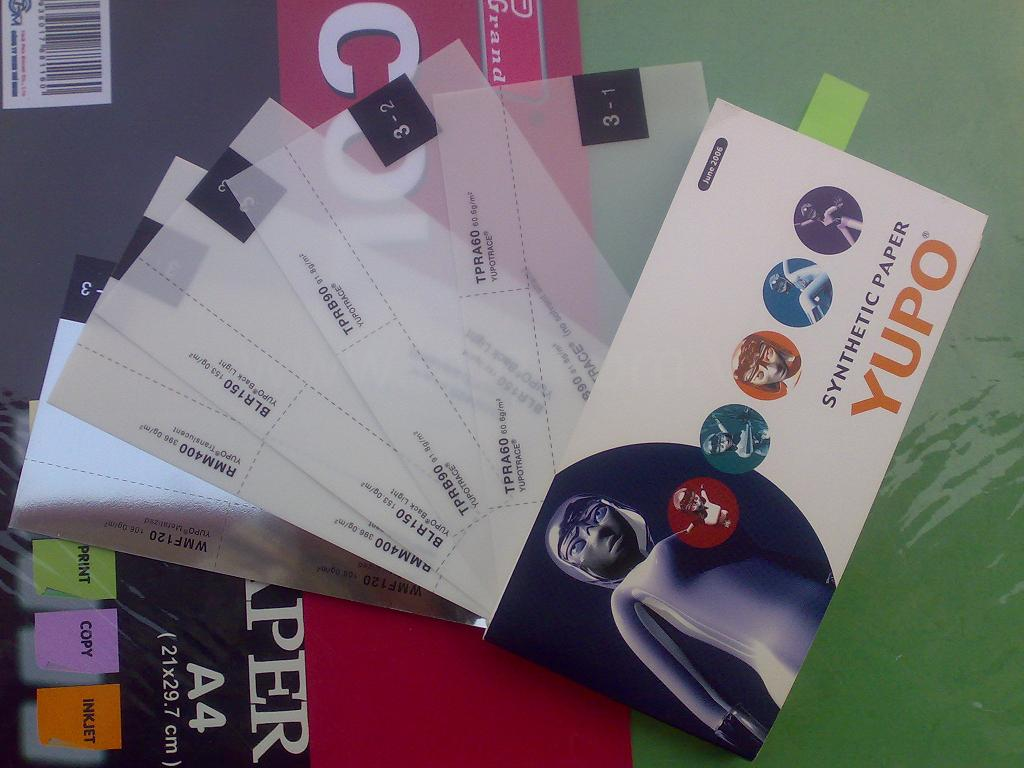
Yupo synthetic paper

Yupo Corporation is a Japanese manufacturer of synthetic paper. It is the largest manufacturer of synthetic paper in the world with a 70% market share. It is owned by Mitsubishi Chemical Corporation and Oji Holdings, also known as the Oji Paper Company.

The firm produces the Yupo brand of polypropylene synthetic paper.

== History ==
Yupo Corporation was established as Oji Yuka Synthetic Paper Co. Ltd in 1970 as a 50/50 joint venture between Oji Paper (now Oji Holdings) and Mitsubishi Petrochemical (now Mitsubishi Chemical). One year prior in 1969, the two companies had established Oji Yuka Synthetic Paper Research Institute Co., Ltd. While they did work on the development of new products, the company was established because they had developed manufacturing techniques for synthetic paper made of polypropylene. At the time, it attracted a great deal of attention as a joint venture between the Mitsubishi and Mitsui systems that went beyond the usual zaibatsu framework.

The brand name of the synthetic paper is Yupo, which is a combination of "YU" from Mitsubishi Yuka, "P" from paper, and "O" from Oji Paper Co. The initial strategy was to sell their products as a substitute for coated paper and other similar products, but the cost increase caused by the 1970s energy crisis made them change that strategy to sell it instead for applications which paper was ill suited for.

For a long time, the Kashima Plant in Ibaraki Prefecture was the only production base, but due to the growth in exports, Yupo expanded to a second production base in the United States in 1998 for domestic production and sales. A sales company was also established in Europe in 2000. Yupo also has multiple sales offices in Asia.

=== Chronology ===
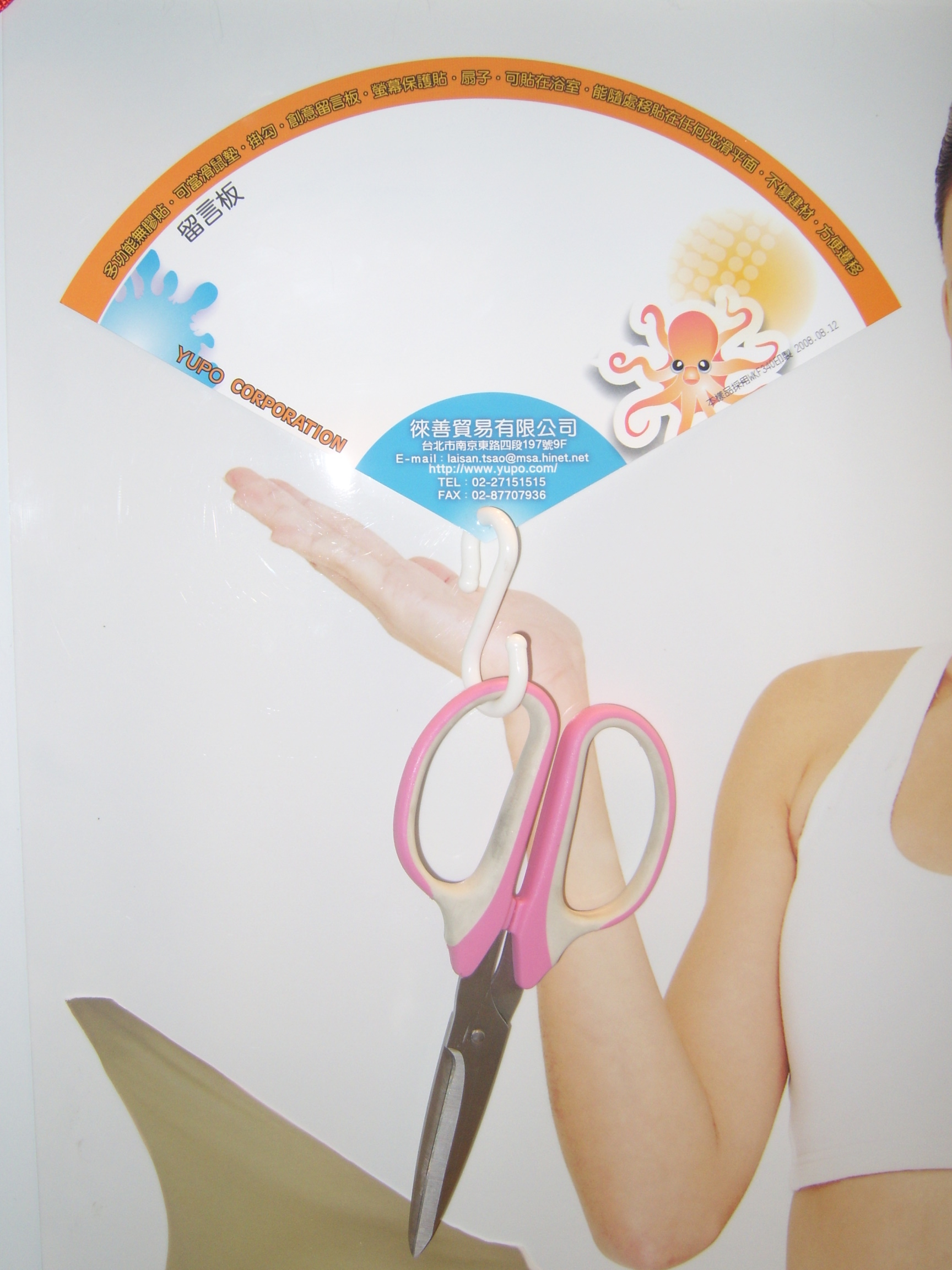
Yupo-A sample of slap-sticker

- 1969, May 10 – Oji Yuka Synthetic Paper Research Institute established.
- 1970, May 25 – Oji Yuka Synthetic Paper Co., Ltd. established with investment from Mitsubishi Yuka and Oji Paper.
- 1971, July – Kashima factory starts operation.
- 1973, January – Merged with Oji Yuka Synthetic Paper Research Laboratory and integrated production and development.
- 1975, February 1 – Mitsubishi Yuka and Oji Paper consolidate sales departments to establish Oji Yuka Synthetic Paper Sales Co., Ltd.
- 1982, January 1 – Merged with sales department Oji Petrochemical Synthetic Paper, unifying production and sales.
- 1996, January 15 – Established production subsidiary Yupo Corporation America in the US (100% shareholder).
- 1998, September 30 – New factory completed in the United States.
- 2000, June 1 – Established sales company YUPO Europe GmbH in Germany (100% shareholder).
- 2001, January 1 – Company name changed from Oji Petrochemical Synthetic Paper to Yupo Corporation.
- 2007 – Signed business consignment contract with Mitsubishi Chemical (China) Management Co., Ltd.
- 2011 – Signed business contract with Mitsubishi Chemical India pvt.ltd
- 2014 – Signed business consignment contract with Mitsubishi Chemical Thailand Co., Ltd.

== Main locations ==
The corporate headquarters is located at 4 Shin Ochanomizu Building, Kanda-Surugadai, Chiyoda, Tokyo.

The company's production base is the Kashima factory of Mitsubishi Chemical located in Ibaraki Prefecture Kamisu City Towada, close to Ibaraki Plant. Its subsidiary, Yupo Corporation America, is located in Virginia.

== Related items ==
- List of Japanese companies

== Sources ==
- Oji Paper (ed.) "Oji Papersha History", Main Edition, Oji Paper, 2001
