= Matheson (compressed gas & equipment) =

American compressed gas company

Nippon Sanso Matheson
- Type: Private (subsidiary)
- Industry: Chemicals
- Founded: 1927 (as Matheson Gas Products)
- Headquarters: Las Colinas Irving, TX, US
- Products: bulk and packaged compressed gas (industrial, specialty, welding, propane, medical), cryogenics and liquefied gas, semiconductor manufacturing materials, gas handling systems & equipment
- Number of employees: 4,500
- Parent: Nippon Sanso Holdings Corporation
- Website: http://us.nipponsanso.com/

Nippon Sanso Matheson Is a US based company that produces industrial, medical, and specialty gases, and associated gas handling equipment, in North America. It is headquartered in Irving, Texas. Nippon Sanso Matheson offers semiconductor, medical, welding, atmospheric, and rare gases, and delivers them via pipelines, onsite generators, bulk tanks, and in gas cylinders to customers using gases in labs, semiconductor fabs, hospitals, chemical plants, manufacturing, and many other processes. Furthermore, Nippon Sanso Matheson also designs and manufactures gas-purification systems, generators, delivery systems, filters, gas purifiers, detection equipment, control valves, and management accessories; and gas cylinder enclosures, source manifolds, and panels, as well as helium-recovery solutions. In addition, the company provides support, engineering, and systems management services to analytical laboratories and semiconductor manufacturers worldwide.

Nippon Sanso Matheson is the North American operating entity and the largest subsidiary of Nippon Sanso Holdings Corporation (NSHD). NSHD one of the top four suppliers of industrial gases in the world, and the largest in Japan. NSHD is an affiliate of Mitsubishi Chemical Holdings and the Mitsubishi Keiretsu.

== History ==
Matheson Gas Products was founded in 1927 in North Bergen, New Jersey, by Adam Matheson. By virtue of the founding of his company, Adam Matheson created the specialty gas business. Among Matheson's more notable accomplishments are the development of the lecture bottle, now used by virtually every major college and university in the world; and the supply of ultra-pure gases that served as standards for the first gas chromatographs.

In 1966, Matheson acquired Grey Chemical of Gloucester, Massachusetts, USA, a producer of ultra-pure gas materials used in electronics manufacturing.

In 1981, Matheson became the first commercial producer of silane, for which it was awarded a “Semmy” Award by the Semiconductor Equipment and Materials Institute (the award is now known as a “Semi”, and the organization has since changed its name to Semiconductor Equipment and Materials International).

Through the last quarter of the 20th century, Matheson Gas Products was anchored by gas-blending and -filling production sites in East Rutherford NJ, Morrow GA, Joliet IL, Gloucester MA, and Newark CA.

In 1989, Matheson Gas Products was purchased by Nippon Sanso Corporation (Tokyo, Japan). Nippon Sanso later (1992) purchased Tri-Gas of Irving, Texas, USA. The operations were not merged until 1999, with the formation of Matheson Tri-Gas – the combined operations at this point spanning specialty and industrial gases and equipment, and including six air-separation units.

In 2004, Nippon Sanso merged with Taiyo Toyo Sanso Corporation to form Taiyo Nippon Sanso Corporation. After Mitsubishi Chemical Company acquired a controlling interest in Taiyo Nippon Sanso Corporation in 2018, Matheson was reorganized as part of Nippon Sanso Holdings Corporation in 2020.

Significant expansion in the industrial sector occurred between 2004 and 2009. Matheson acquired six additional air separation units in 2004. It then acquired Linweld (Nebraska) in 2006, Polar Cryogenics (Oregon) in 2007, Five Star Gas and Gear (California) in 2008, AERIS (California) in 2008, Advanced Gas Technologies (Pennsylvania) in 2008, Valley National Gases (Ohio) in 2009, and ETOX (Texas) in 2009.

In May 2010, Matheson acquired Western International Gas & Cylinders, Inc. of Texas, USA, the largest acetylene wholesaler in the world, and manufacturer of cylinders, valves, and related handling equipment.

On July 1, 2010, Matheson Tri-Gas, Inc. changed its logo and public name to "MATHESON". The name of the legal entity remains "Matheson Tri-Gas, Inc."

In 2013, MATHESON acquired Continental Carbonic Products Inc., an Illinois-based manufacturer and supplier of dry ice and liquid carbon dioxide operating 31 branch locations and eight production facilities.

In February 2015, MATHESON continued its expansion in Southern California and Hawaii with the acquisition of Sims Welding Supply and assets and operations of Air Liquide America LP, respectively.

In January 2016, MATHESON acquired 18 air separation units, 2 nitrous oxide production facilities, and 4 liquid carbon dioxide facilities from Air Liquide and Airgas divestitures.

In 2026, MATHESON (historically known as Matheson Tri-Gas) officially changed its name to "Nippon Sanso Matheson" starting April 1, 2026. The change is part of a broader global rebranding strategy by Nippon Sanso Holdings Corporation to unify its international subsidiaries under the single, globally recognized "Nippon Sanso" name.

MATHESON's footprint in the USA includes forty air separation units, six helium transfills, three acetylene plants, two nitrous oxide plants, twelve carbon dioxide plants, and over 300 retail facilities, depots, fill plants, and manufacturing sites.

== Industries served ==
Nippon Sanso Matheson's primary products are:

Electronics Materials and Equipment, including high purity gas, gas mixtures, purification devices and other hardware and services – primarily serving the electronics and LED fabrication and semiconductor manufacturing industries.

Industrial gas, Applications Technology, and Equipment, including on-site and merchant bulk gas and equipment and packaged gases and equipment for welding (argon) & cutting, construction, medical oxygen, laser, wine making, food processing & preservation nitrogen, beverage making (carbonation), helium supply & recovery, residential and commercial propane, rare gases and other areas.

Specialty Gases and Equipment, including high purity gas, gas mixtures, environmental gas calibration standards, EPA Protocol Gases, and associated hardware and services – primarily serving the laboratory, process, and environmental gas user and other specialties.

HyCO (Hydrogen, Carbon Monoxide) plant engineering, construction and operation. With the acquisition of the divested HyCO business at Linde (agreed to as part of the Linde-Praxair merger in 2019), Nippon Sanso Matheson builds and operates hydrogen production plants globally.
