= Mitsubishi Chemical Corporation (1950–2017) =

Japanese chemicals company

- Company type: Subsidiary
- Industry: Chemicals
- Headquarters: Japan
- Parent: Mitsubishi Chemical Holdings Corporation
- Website: www.mcgc.com/english

Mitsubishi Chemical Corporation (三菱ケミカル株式会社, Mitsubishi Chemical Kabushiki-gaisha) (MCC) is a subsidiary of Mitsubishi Chemical Holdings Corporation. Mitsubishi Chemical is the largest chemical corporation based in Japan. It was an independent Japanese corporation until it merged with Mitsubishi Pharma Corporation in 2005 to create Mitsubishi Chemical Holdings Corporation.

MCC is co-owner with Oji Paper Company of Yupo brand synthetic paper.

== See also ==
- Mitsubishi Kagaku Media
- Verbatim – A brand that was formerly owned by Mitsubishi Chemical Corporation
