= Nippon Sanso Holdings Corporation =

Japanese industrial gas manufacturer

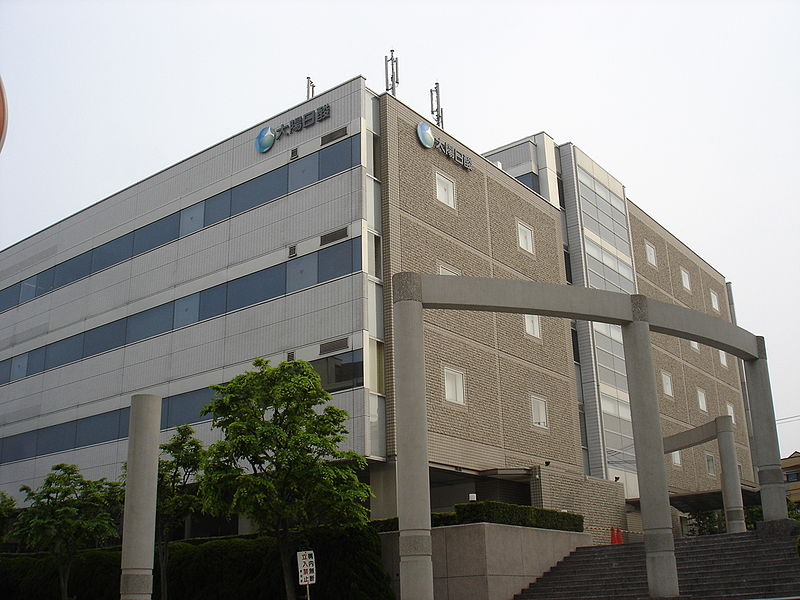
- NSHD headquarters in Tokyo
- Native name: 日本酸素ホールディングス株式会社
- Romanized name: Nippon Sanso Holdings Kabushiki-gaisha
- Type: Public KK
- Traded as: TYO: 4091
- Industry: Chemicals; Health care Engineering
- Founded: 1918; 108 years ago
- Headquarters: Shinagawa-ku, Tokyo 142-8558, Japan
- Area served: Worldwide
- Key people: Toshihiko Hamada (President and CEO)
- Products: Industrial gases; Semiconductor manufacturing materials; Gas handling systems & equipment; LP gases; Vacuum bottles
- Services: Plant engineering; Cryogenic services
- Revenue: ▲JPY 850.2 billion (FY 2019) (US$ 7.8 billion) (FY 2019)
- Net income: ▲JPY 53.3 billion (FY 2019) (US$ 489 million) (FY 2018)
- Total assets: ▼JPY 1.75 Trillion (FY 2019) (US$ 16 Billion) (FY 2019)
- Number of employees: 20,000 (consolidated, as of 31 March 2019)
- Parent: Mitsubishi Chemical Holdings (50.5%)
- Subsidiaries: Thermos; Matheson Tri-Gas; Leeden
- Website: Official website

Nippon Sanso Holdings Corporation (日本酸素ホールディングス株式会社, Nippon Sanso Holdings Kabushiki gaisha), commonly known as NSHD, is a holding company that oversees group companies including the major industrial gas manufacturer Taiyo Nippon Sanso and the stainless steel thermos manufacturer Thermos. It is a consolidated subsidiary of the Mitsubishi Chemical Group.

NSHD is one of the major global supplier of industrial gas, with operations in Japan, the United States, Europe, and the Asia-Oceania region. It operates in more than 30 countries through its own brand, subsidiaries, and affiliate companies.

== History ==
Nippon Sanso was first established in 1910 as the Nippon Sanso joint-stock company and formally founded as the Nippon Sanso Corporation in 1918. In 1989 it acquired Thermos Japan and Matheson (compressed gas & equipment). On 13 May 2014, Mitsubishi Chemical Holdings announced an agreement for Taiyo Nippon Sanso to become an affiliate of Mitsubishi Chemical, a core company within the Mitsubishi group. Mitsubishi Chemical subsequently increased its stake in Taiyo Nippon Sanso to 50.5%. In 2020 the company was renamed to Sanso Holdings Corporation as it transitioned to a holding company.

== Products & Services ==
NSHD's primary products include:

- High purity gas, gas mixtures, purification devices, services, equipment such as small-scale nitrogen generators, MOCVD equipment, and exhaust gas abatement systems.
- Industrial gases such as oxygen, nitrogen, and argon for supply to a wide range of industries, including the steel, chemical, electronics, automobile, construction, shipbuilding and food industries.
- Air separation plants, space simulation chambers, and equipment related to liquid helium
- LP Gas for use in a wide variety of applications including taxis and other commercial vehicles, air conditioners, and aerosol propellants.
- Thermos-branded products, as well as stainless steel water bottles. In 1978, the company developed the world's first stainless steel vacuum-insulated bottle.
