= American Thermos Bottle Company Laurel Hill Plant =

- U.S. National Register of Historic Places
- U.S. Historic district
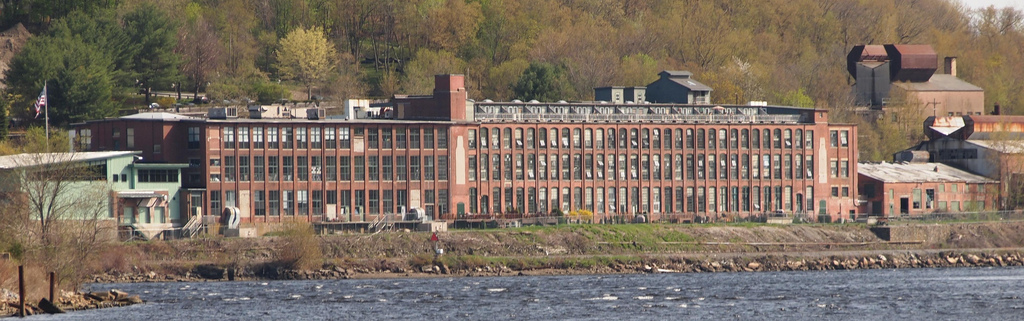

- Location within Connecticut Location within the United States
- Location: 11 Thermos Avenue, Norwich, Connecticut
- Coordinates: 41°30′37″N 72°4′43″W
- Area: 8.7 acres (3.5 ha)
- Built: Varies
- Architectural style: Varies
- NRHP reference No.: 88003091
- Added to NRHP: July 17, 1989

The American Thermos Bottle Company Laurel Hill Plant is located in the Laurel Hill Historic District section of Norwich, Connecticut. It includes 11 contributing buildings and two other contributing structures. The original plant was built during 1912–13 and used a historic Italianate house as a company office building. The plant was the primary factory where Thermos brand vacuum flask bottles were manufactured from 1913 to 1984. It is historically significant in its connection to the Thermos Company and the history of Norwich. The complex is architecturally significant because it displays the adaptive use of industrial mill design to new industry. It was added to the National Register of Historic Places in 1989.

Numerous changes and renovations have occurred since its nomination. Condominiums have since been constructed in the area, and the large manufacturing building has been renovated and re-purposed for loft-style apartments. Two buildings were demolished on the northern end of the property in order to construct the Integrated Day Charter School which was completed in 2008. The school brought a new two-story addition which provided an indoor gymnasium, kitchen, offices, and a new lobby for the school.

== Background ==
The citizens of Norwich, Connecticut, sought out the Thermos company to build and operate a plant on the banks of the Thames River. A group of citizens under the group "Norwich Boomers" rallied the community to purchase 27 acres (11 ha) of land for $750 per acre ($1,900/ha) so that it could be used for the Thermos Plant. The house of Dr. William H. Mason was included in the purchase. The Italianate house was converted to be used as an office building. Together, the citizens and the city raised $78,000. A contract was signed on February 14, 1912, designating Norwich as the home of the Thermos Plant. In return, Thermos would include the city's name in the company's advertisements. Thermos would even mark the products produced in Norwich with "Made in Norwich". Allyn L. Brown acted as attorney and provided counsel for the deal. The construction of the plant was a boon for Norwich, which helped the employment of the area after the decline of the textile industry. The operations expanded into nearby Taftville, operating until they were phased out and shut down in 1988.

== Plant overview ==
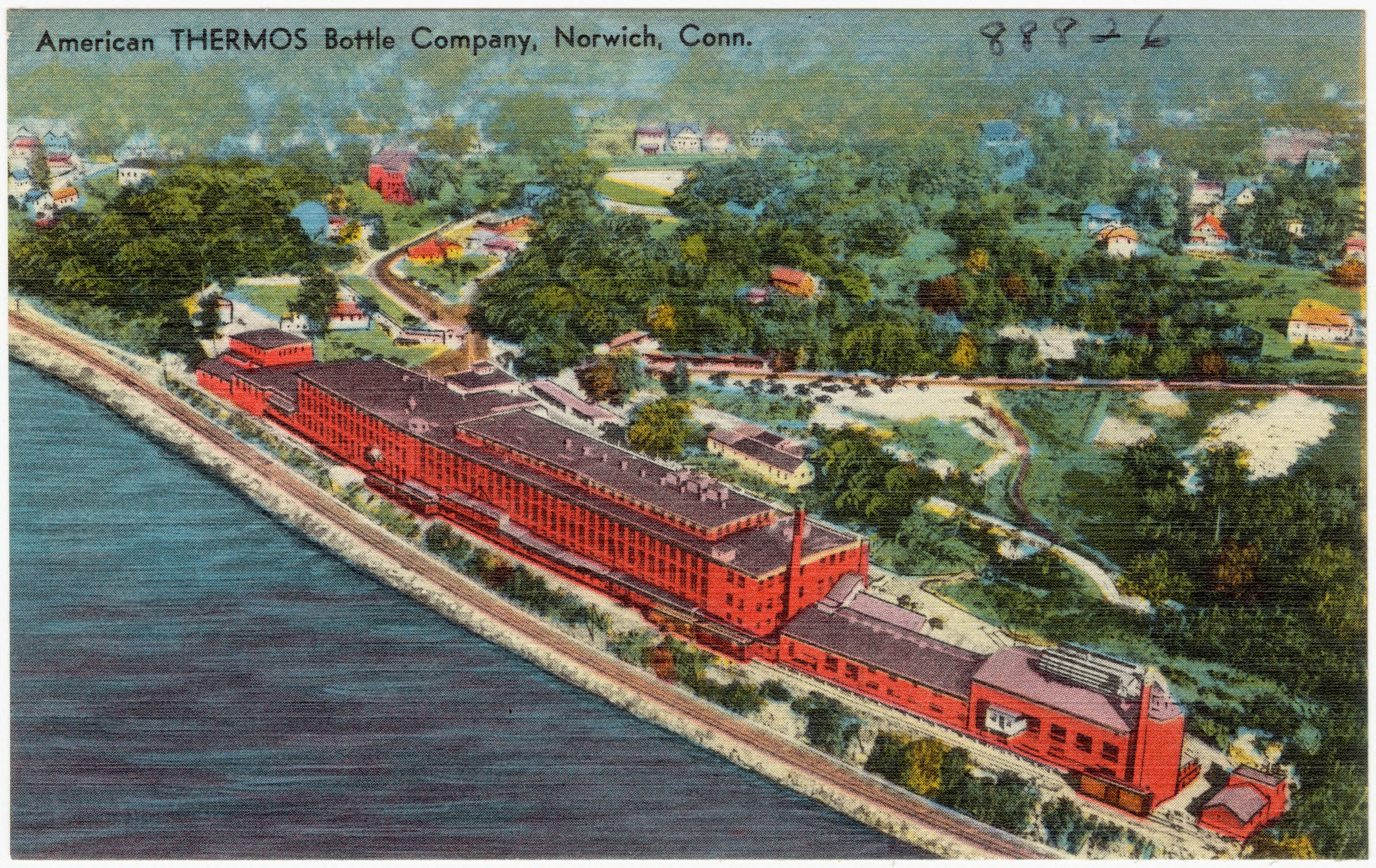
Aerial view of the Thermos plant

The Thermos plant was laid out roughly north to south along the Thames River, a mixture of interconnected buildings and stand-alone structures. The stand-alone structures included three propane sheds (Buildings 63, 64, and 65) that were located near the Human Resources building (Building 86) and its storage shed (Building 30). The main structure was a string of connecting buildings that were integrated into the operation of the plant. At the north end was the Research and Development building (Building 87), connected to two large storage buildings (Building 1 and 2). The main offices were in (Building 85). Building 2 was connected to the Manufacturing Building (Building 3), which was connected to the Manufacturing Glass House (Building 5) and Glass House 2 (Building 32). Building 32 also served as a storage building. The Glass House Cullet & Mix House (Number 7) and the Compressor & Auxiliary Generator building (Number 9) were connected to Building 5.

The plant consisted of the company offices and the large Manufacturing Building. The Mason house became the company office, constructed in 1861. It is a two-story brick Italianate style house that was significantly modified over the years. A wing was added in 1929 connecting it to the metal products building which was built the same year. In 1942, a two-story front addition was added and another addition to the west was added around 1950. These additions also resulted in the removal of the cupola, brick chimneys, front entry, and veranda. The Manufacturing building was constructed from 1912 to 1913, three stories high on the river side and two stories on the east. It is divided into 31 bays with pilasters. At each end of the building are stairs and elevator towers. The structural remains of the original glass house survive as a sub-basement in a one-story extension at the south end of the building.

The Human Resources and Research and Development buildings were constructed around 1912 by the MacKay Copper Process Company. The Thermos Company acquired the property in 1923 following the foreclosure of the MacKay company. The Human Resources building was used by the enameling department until its conversion in 1948. The Research and Development building was previously the Engineering building. A one-story hipped frame gatehouse was constructed in the 1920s. The Carpenter Shop (Building 62) was constructed in 1926. The Thermos factory completed construction of a storage building in 1929 (Building 2) and another storage building in 1941 (Building 1). Glass House 1 (Building 5) was constructed in 1939 and incorporates a warehouse dating from 1930. Glass House 2 was constructed in 1951 and is connected to the Manufacturing Building by a conveyor.

== Modern use and adaptation ==
The Thermos plant was used as a set in the 1990 movie Everybody Wins, after which the property was partially redeveloped into condominiums. (Note: The Day incorrectly states that the film was released in 1988, when it was 1990.) The project failed and resulted in the closure of the Brooklyn Savings Bank in 1990. The Federal Deposit Insurance Corporation purchased the Thermos on Thames condominium assets for $420,000. Approximately $1.2 million was raised by auction for the purchase of 25 condominiums, but 55 unsold units were transferred to Real Estate Seizure Sales and 30 acres (12 ha) to Thermos Norwich Developers LLC. The factory was also converted to loft-style apartments.

In 1997, the Integrated Day Charter School renovated a 16,000-square-foot (1,500 m^{2}) section of the factory for use as a school. This required the demolition of two buildings to serve as space for a playground and parking spaces. The total cost of the renovations was estimated at $750,000, partly paid by the State of Connecticut. Integrated Day Charter School has a maximum enrollment of 330 students from pre-kindergarten to eighth grade, with a majority of children residing in the Norwich area and 15-percent in nearby towns. The school has an application wait list and holds a lottery for admittance of pre-kindergarten students.

The plant and the surrounding area have undergone numerous changes since its NHRP nomination which have affected or removed buildings. Research and Development and Storage Building 1 was removed. The "Colosseum" was an outdoor gym which retained sides of the former building. The two-story addition was completed in 2008 and created an indoor gymnasium, kitchen, offices, and a new lobby for the school at a cost of $2 million. The renovation of the large Manufacturing building included the installation of new windows and energy-efficient roofing. along with the installation of modern mechanical, electrical, and plumbing systems.

== Significance ==
The American Thermos Bottle Company Laurel Hill Plant is historically significant as the primary factory for the production of Thermos bottles that enabled the company to dominate in the world market. It is also historically significant as an example of the Norwich community coming together to attract the company and diversify the local industry. The plant was the primary factory where Thermos bottles were manufactured from raw materials between 1913 and 1984. The complex is architecturally significant as an example of late-19th century and early 20th century industrial mill design being adapted for new industry. The American Thermos Bottle Company Laurel Hill Plant was added to the National Register of Historic Places in 1989.

== See also ==
- List of bottle types, brands and companies
- National Register of Historic Places listings in New London County, Connecticut
