= Laurel Hill Historic District =

Historic district in Connecticut, United States

- U.S. National Register of Historic Places
- U.S. Historic district
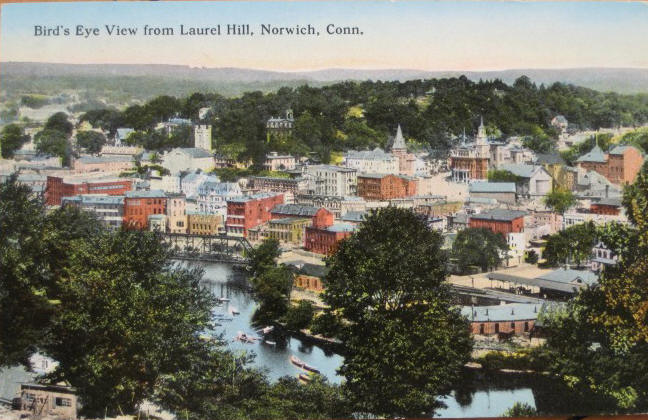

- Location within Connecticut Location within the United States
- Location: Roughly bounded by Spruce Street, Rogers and River Avenues, and Talman Street, Norwich, Connecticut
- Coordinates: 41°31′4″N 72°4′29″W
- Area: 120 acres (49 ha)
- Architect: Bill, Henry
- Architectural style: Late Victorian, Italianate, Folk Victorian
- NRHP reference No.: 87000516
- Added to NRHP: October 26, 1987

The Laurel Hill Historic District is a predominantly residential historic district south of downtown Norwich, Connecticut. The district was added to the National Register of Historic Places on October 26, 1987. It extends south from the Shetucket River along Laurel Hill Avenue, River Avenue, and Spruce Street. This area was developed as a residential district beginning in 1850, and includes a significant number of well-preserved Italianate and Gothic Revival houses.

== Description and history ==
Laurel Hill is located south of downtown Norwich, separated from it by the Shetucket River. The neighborhood is characterized by relatively steep hillsides Laurel Hill Avenue, its principal roadway, runs south from a pair of bridges over that river, parallel to the Thames River, on a terrace of the hillside. Spruce Street, River Avenue, and Summer Street are secondary residential streets paralleling Laurel Hill Avenue on different levels of the hill. The historic district has 124 houses and one industrial building, almost all of which date to the 19th century. About one third of the houses are Italianate in style, reflective of the area's development in the 1850s and 1860s, while Carpenter Gothic and Queen Anne Victorian styles are also well represented. The only significant non-residential building is a c. 1871 Italianate schoolhouse, which is one of two brick buildings (the other is a house) in the district. The district also includes Laurel Hill Park, an early feature of the development.

Laurel Hill was largely undeveloped before 1850, because of its difficult terrain. In 1850, a consortium of developers led by Henry Bill purchased most of the land in the area, laid out Laurel Hill Avenue, and began promoting it as a residential suburban area in the country style advocated by Andrew Jackson Downing. Early construction, near the Shetucket River, consisted of large and handsomely landscaped lots. As part of his promotion of the area, Bill advocated for the construction of a toll-free bridge across the river, and built his own home prominently overlooking the river. The area experienced significant growth due to a business boom caused by the American Civil War, which continued into the post-war years. Many high quality homes were built, although the size of home lots decreased further south in the neighborhood, and some multi-family residences were also built.

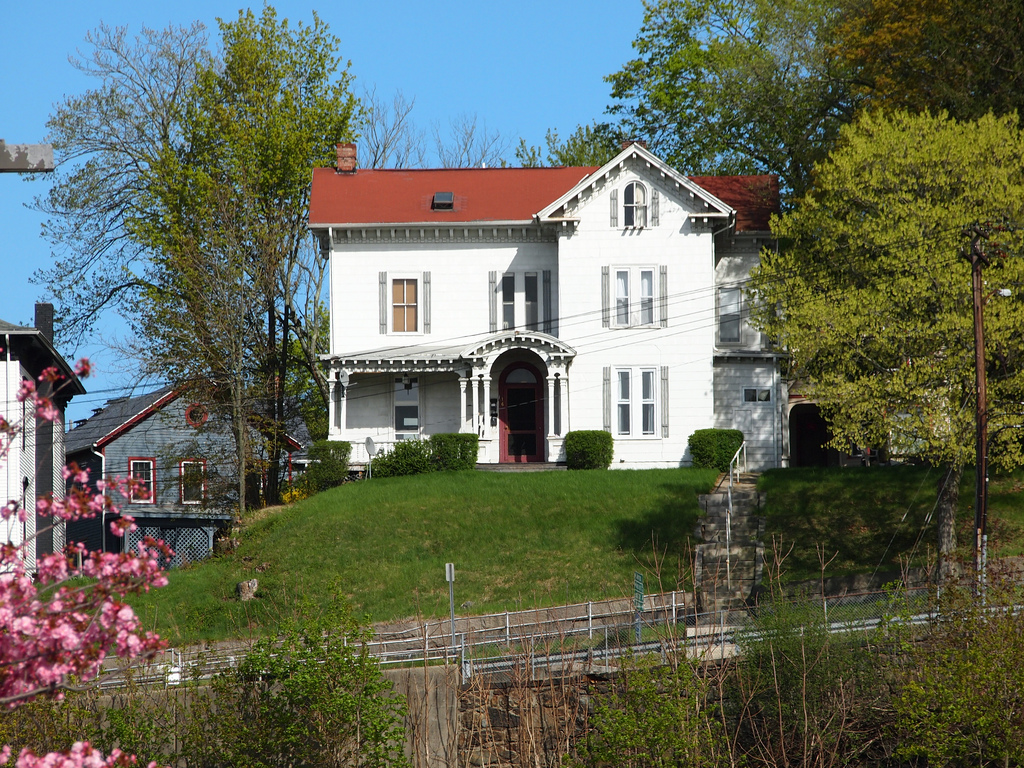
Italianate (1868)

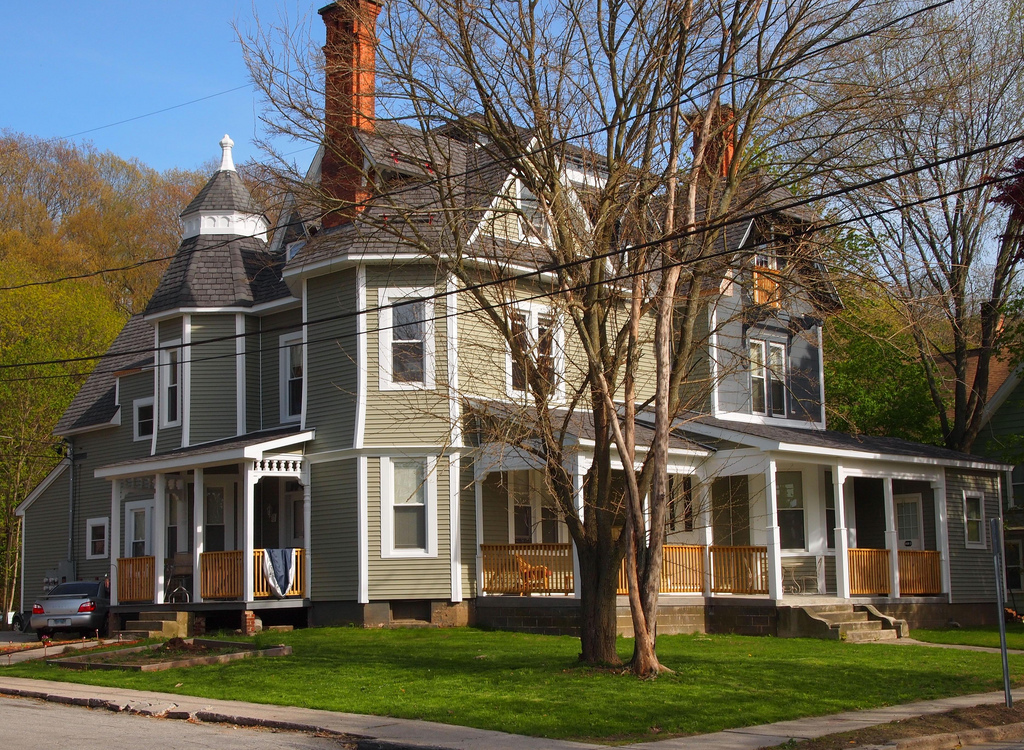
American Queen Anne (1882)

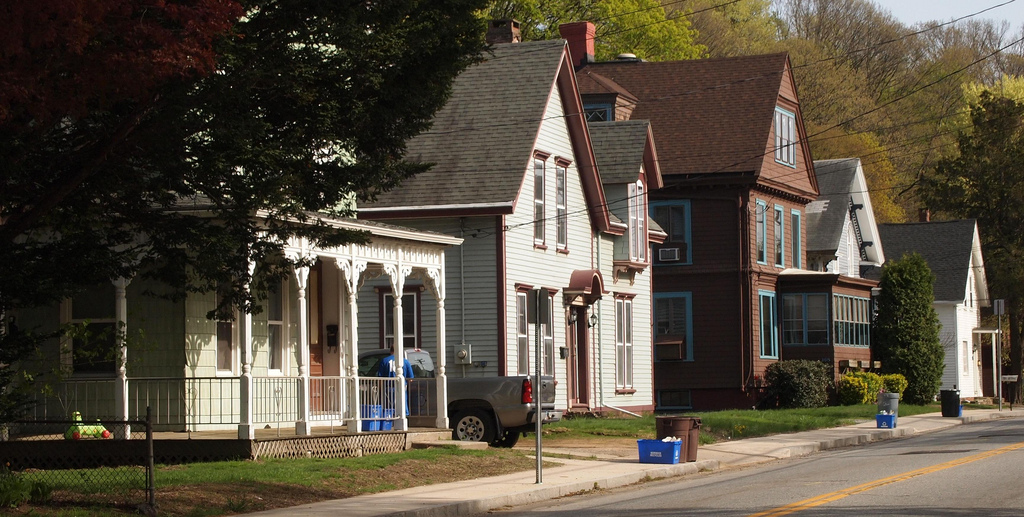

== See also ==
- Neighborhoods of Norwich, Connecticut
- American Thermos Bottle Company Laurel Hill Plant, which lies southwest of the district along the Thames River
- National Register of Historic Places listings in New London County, Connecticut
