= Tervis Tumbler =

American drinkware manufacturer

Tervis Tumbler Company
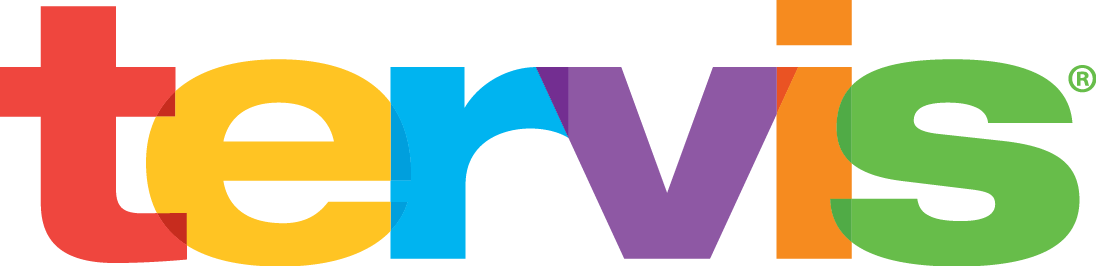
- Company type: Private
- Industry: Drinkware
- Founded: 1946; 80 years ago
- Founders: Frank Cotter; G. Howlett Davis
- Headquarters: Venice, Florida, United States
- Products: Tumblers and accessories
- Website: tervis.com

Tervis Tumbler Company is an American manufacturer of double-walled, insulated tumblers. The double-wall insulation is made by inserting a liner inside an outer shell, creating a layer of air between them. The two liners are then permanently fused together. The insulation reduces condensation and keeps beverages hotter or colder longer than non-insulated cups and glasses.

== History ==
The original technology was developed by two engineers, Frank Cotter and G. Howlett Davis, in Detroit, Michigan in 1946. Their design involves a permanently sealed double-walled tumbler. Cotter and Davis combined the last three letters of their surnames to come up with the name Tervis. John C. Winslow purchased the Tervis product rights in the 1940s. The Tervis Tumbler Company was incorporated in 1967.

In January 2018, "Trinity Graphic USA Inc., based in Sarasota... filed a [federal] lawsuit... alleging that... Tervis caused more than $25 million in damages by violating a non-disclosure agreement."

On September 5, 2024, Tervis filed for Chapter 11 bankruptcy, blaming several factors as part of the decision, including a heavy loss in sales after a boost from the COVID-19 pandemic, high rising costs, and unprofitable stores. The company hopes to exit bankruptcy before the end of the year as part of a comeback strategy.

== Products ==
Tervis sells tumblers, mugs, and water bottles.

Tervis also sells branded drinkware through licensing agreements with all four of the major American sports leagues (MLB, NBA, NFL, and NHL), nearly all major NCAA colleges and universities, all branches of the United States Armed Forces, and many companies.

== Conservation efforts ==
Tervis Tumbler has engaged in campaigns to help reduce the use of disposable plastics. On September 27, 2018, the company gave away 10,000 reusable tumblers to customers who pledged to stop using disposable cups. In March 2019, they partnered with 4ocean to clean the beaches of Siesta Key, Florida.

== See also ==
- Vacuum flask
