= Thermos LLC =

Manufacturer of insulated food and beverage containers

- Founded: 1904; 122 years ago in Germany
- Headquarters: Schaumburg, Illinois, United States
- Number of locations: 10 offices across 8 countries
- Key people: Alex Huang (CEO)
- Owner: Taiyo Nippon Sanso Corporation
- Website: www.thermos.com

Thermos LLC is a manufacturer of insulated food and beverage containers and other consumer products. The company was originally founded in Germany in 1904 and is now headquartered in the United States, under the ownership of the Japanese company Nippon Sanso.

In 1989, the Thermos operating companies in Japan, the UK, Canada and Australia were acquired by Nippon Sanso K.K., which had developed the world's first stainless steel vacuum bottle in 1978, before it renamed itself Taiyo Nippon Sanso Corporation, as which it remains known in the present day. Taiyo Nippon Sanso also acquired the original Thermos GmbH company in Langewiesen, Germany, that still owned 15 original patents. This part of Thermos had been located behind the "Iron Curtain" since 1945 but the German reunification encouraged foreign investments.

== Thermos as a trademark ==
In the United States, the word thermos is a genericized trademark used sometimes, since the early 20th century, as a term for any vacuum-insulated flask regardless of manufacturer. From around 1910 until 1922, the American Thermos Bottle Company strove for this synonymity, as it was considered free advertising; the value of such advertising was estimated, in 1917, at between $3 and $4 million worth in American dollars alone. As the company and the vacuum-flask market grew, it became increasingly protective of its trademark, which it registered in 1923, following a narrow lawsuit victory over flask retailer W. T. Grant Company. Starting in 1935, Thermos employed a clipping service to find unauthorized usages and protested to dictionary editors who included thermos as a word rather than a proper name. A 1940 internal memo said the definitions "undoubtedly would be cited against us in a lawsuit to defend the trademark. The best we can do is to try to 'purify' the definition of the word." Into the 1950s, Thermos continued its efforts to protect it, creating various products (tents, lanterns, campstoves) bearing the name to affirm it as a brand name, not an item.

In 1958, Aladdin Industries announced intent to sell "thermos bottles", and the Thermos trademark holder (then named the 'King-Seeley Thermos Company') sued for infringement. In 1962, Judge Robert Anderson ruled that thermos was a generic term, due largely to Thermos's own publicization and lack of diligence in defending the trademark. Aladdin (or any company) could mark its bottles with a lowercase "thermos", while the Thermos company retained the uppercase usage.

== History ==
In 1892, James Dewar, a Scottish-born scientist, working at Cambridge University, invented the vacuum-insulated flask, a scientific vessel for storing liquefied gases. It was not a household item fit for everyday use like carrying warm coffee. In 1903, the German glass blower Reinhold Burger received a German patent for an isolating vessel for everyday use. In 1904, Burger registered the trademark Thermos® for his patent. In 1906, the company Thermos GmbH was formed by Burger with Albert Aschenbrenner and Gustav Robert Paalen. The production of Thermos-branded bottles in the United States was based on US patent 13,093 by Burger and Aschenbrenner.

The vacuum flask is today commonly called the Dewar flask among chemists in recognition of its inventor, though he did not register a patent or trademark for his invention. When Burger and Thermos GmbH did so, Dewar sued, but lost his court case to claim intellectual property rights to the invention.

== Norwich production plant ==
The citizens of Norwich, Connecticut, US sought out the Thermos company to build and operate a plant on the banks of the Thames River. A group of citizens under the group "Norwich Boomers" rallied the community to purchase 27 acres of land for $750 an acre so that it could be used for the Thermos. The house of Dr. William H. Mason was also on the property, and it was also a part of the purchase. The Italianate house was converted to be used as an office building. Together, the citizens and the city raised $78,000. A contract was signed on February 14, 1912, it would make Norwich the home of the Thermos Plant and that Thermos would use Norwich's name on its advertising. Allyn L. Brown acted as attorney and provided counsel for the deal. Thermos products produced in Norwich bear a stamp "Made in Norwich".

The construction of the plant was a boon for Norwich, which helped the employment of the area after the decline of the textile industry. The operations expanded into nearby Taftville, Connecticut and together the plants were active until they were phased out and shut down in 1988. The Norwich site was listed as a historic district on the National Register of Historic Places in 1989.

== Expansion ==
In 1955, the Thermos company, then named the American Thermos Bottle Company, acquired control of Hemp and Company, Inc., of Macomb, Illinois, manufacturers of the Little Brown Jug and other insulated jugs and chests, as well as Duncan Hines-branded outdoor grills. To reflect the growing diversity of products, the names of the North American companies were changed again in 1956; the US corporation became the American Thermos Products Company, while what had been the Canadian Thermos Bottle Co. Ltd. changed its name to Canadian Thermos Products Limited.

== Historical importance ==
Thermos products made a major impact in the 1950s and sold over 2 million units. In 2004, the Smithsonian Institution museum featured Thermos products as part of its "Taking America to Lunch" retrospective of lunch kits from the 1880s to the 1980s.

== See also ==
- American Thermos Bottle Company Laurel Hill Plant
