= Mitsubishi Chemical Group =

Japanese chemicals company

Mitsubishi Chemical Group Corporation

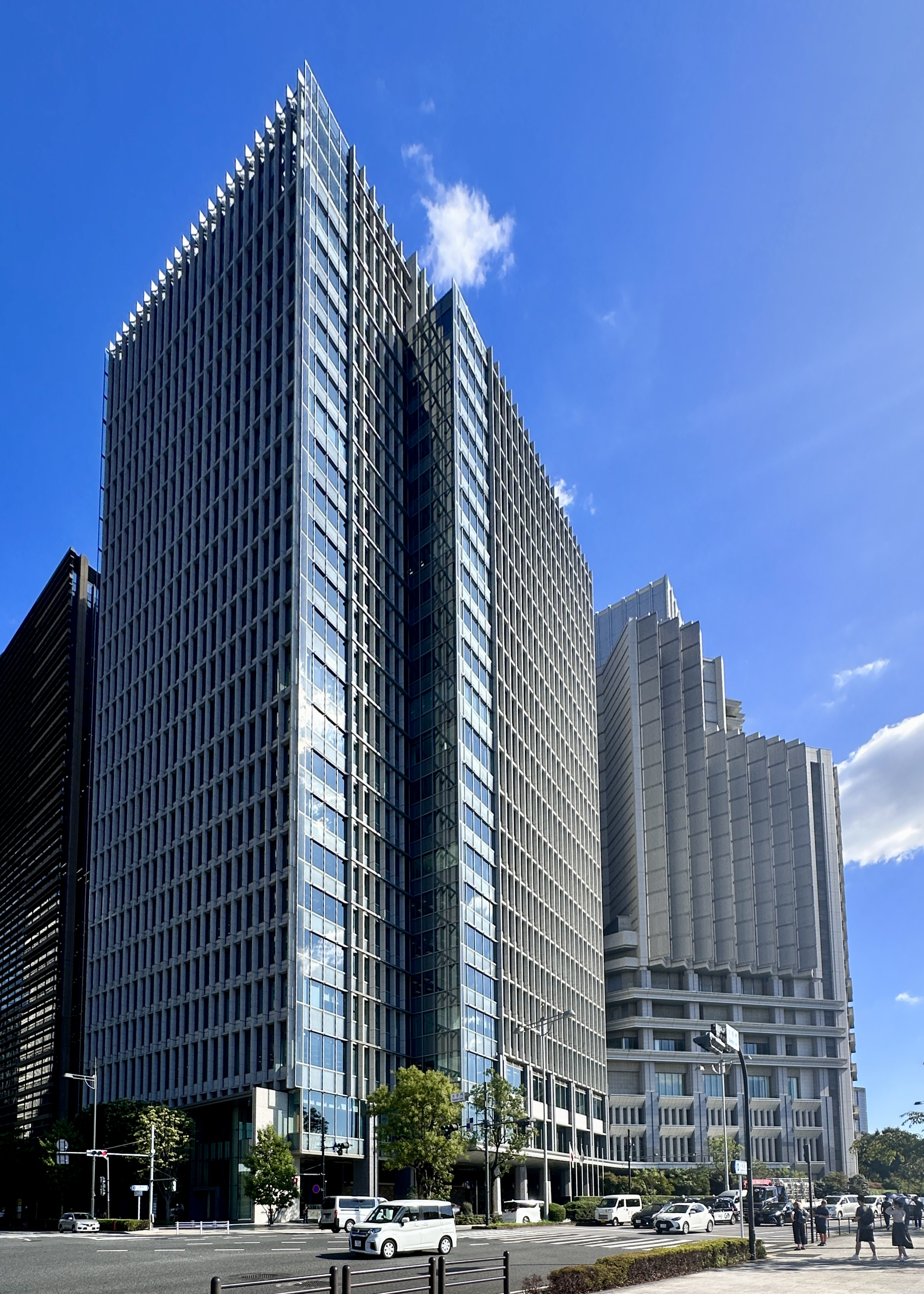
- Headquarters in Marunouchi, Chiyoda, Tokyo
- Native name: 三菱ケミカルグループ株式会社
- Romanized name: Mitsubishi Kemikaru Guruupu Kabushiki-gaisha
- Type: Public
- Traded as: TYO: 4188
- Industry: Chemical
- Predecessor: Mitsubishi Chemical Corporation; Mitsubishi Pharma Corporation (currently Mitsubishi Tanabe Pharma Corporation)
- Founded: 3 October 2005; 21 years ago
- Headquarters: Tokyo, Japan
- Key people: Manabu Chikumoto (CEO); Minoru Kida (CFO)
- Revenue: ▼¥4,387,218 million (2024)
- Operating income: ▲¥261,831 million (2024)
- Net income: ▲¥178,439 million (2024)
- Total assets: ▲¥6,104,513 million (2024)
- Total equity: ▲¥2,275,495 million (2024)
- Number of employees: 63,258 (2025)
- Subsidiaries: Mitsubishi Chemical Corporation; Mitsubishi Plastics; Mitsubishi Rayon; Mitsubishi Kagaku Media; Taiyo Nippon Sanso Corporation
- Website: https://www.mcgc.com/

Mitsubishi Chemical Group Corporation (三菱ケミカルグループ株式会社, Mitsubishi Kemikaru Guruupu Kabushiki-gaisha) is a Japanese chemical industry company formed in October 2005 from the merger of Mitsubishi Chemical Corporation and Mitsubishi Pharma Corporation. The company is headquartered in Tokyo and is one of the major companies in the Mitsubishi multinational conglomerate.

== History ==
On December 4, 2021, the company announced they would be leaving the commodity chemical businesses by the 2023 fiscal year. The petrochemical and coal-chemical units accounted for $4.8 billion a year in sales and they said the reason for divesting is Japan's shift toward carbon neutrality and poor growth potential.
