= Vacuum flask =

Double-walled insulated storage vessel

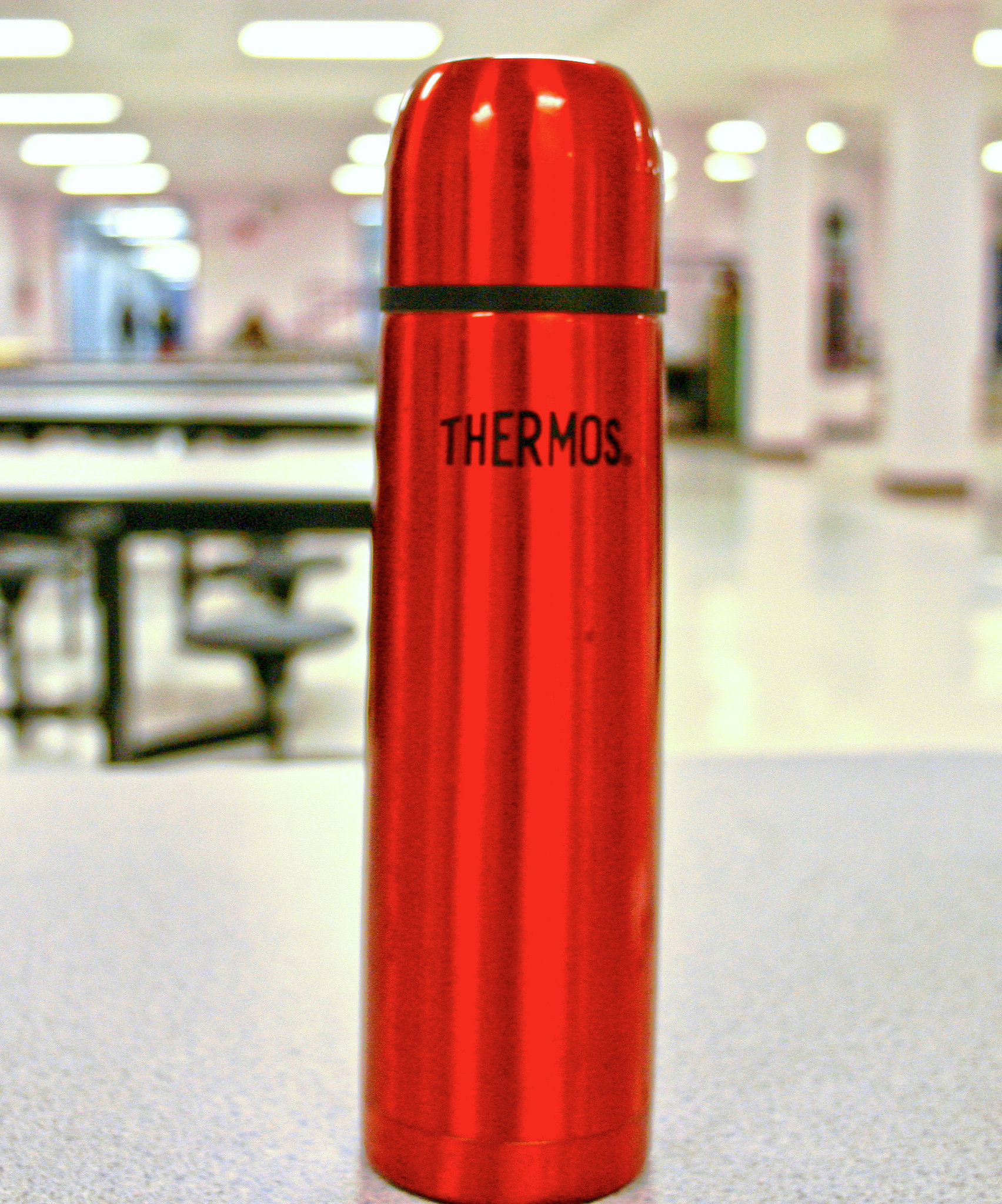
The typical design of a Thermos brand vacuum flask, used for maintaining the temperature of fluids such as coffee

A vacuum flask (also known as a Dewar flask, Dewar bottle or thermos) is an insulating storage vessel that slows the rate at which its contents change in temperature. It greatly lengthens the time over which its contents remain hotter or cooler than the flask's surroundings by trying to be as adiabatic as possible. Invented by James Dewar in 1892, the vacuum flask consists of two flasks, placed one within the other and joined at the neck. The gap between the two flasks is partially evacuated of air, creating a near-vacuum which significantly reduces heat transfer by conduction or convection. When used to hold cold liquids, this also virtually eliminates condensation on the outside of the flask.

Vacuum flasks are used domestically to keep contents inside hot or cold for extended periods of time. They are also used for thermal cooking. Vacuum flasks are also used for many purposes in industry.

== History ==
Diagram of a vacuum flask

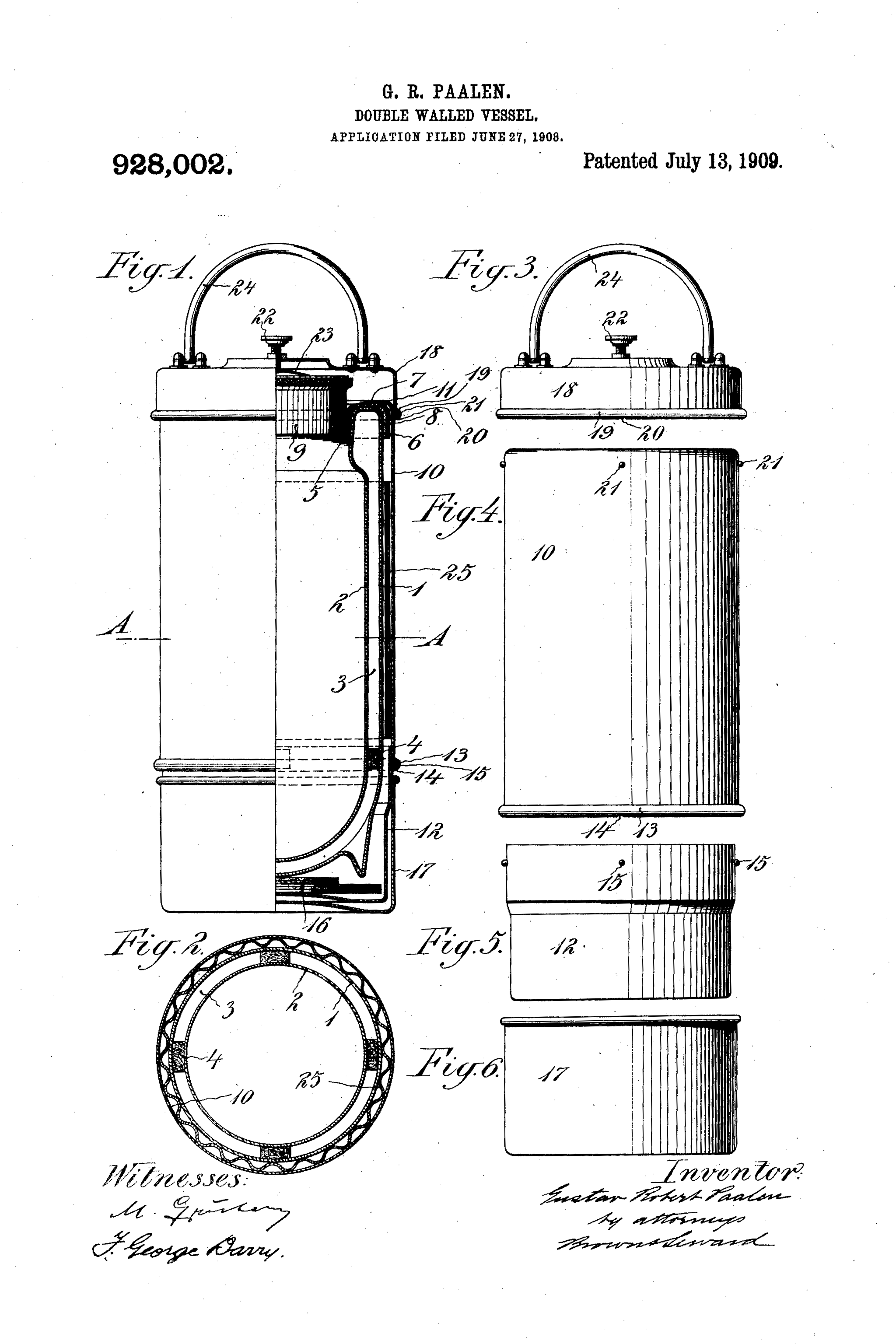
Gustav Robert Paalen, Double Walled Vessel. Patent 27 June 1908, published 13 July 1909

The vacuum flask was designed and invented by Scottish scientist James Dewar in 1892 as a result of his research in the field of cryogenics and is sometimes called a Dewar flask in his honour. While performing experiments in determining the specific heat of the element palladium, Dewar made a brass chamber that he enclosed in another chamber to keep the palladium at its desired temperature. He evacuated the air between the two chambers, creating a partial vacuum to keep the temperature of the contents stable. Dewar refused to patent his invention; this allowed others to develop the flask using new materials such as glass and aluminium, and it became a significant tool for chemical experiments and also a common household item.

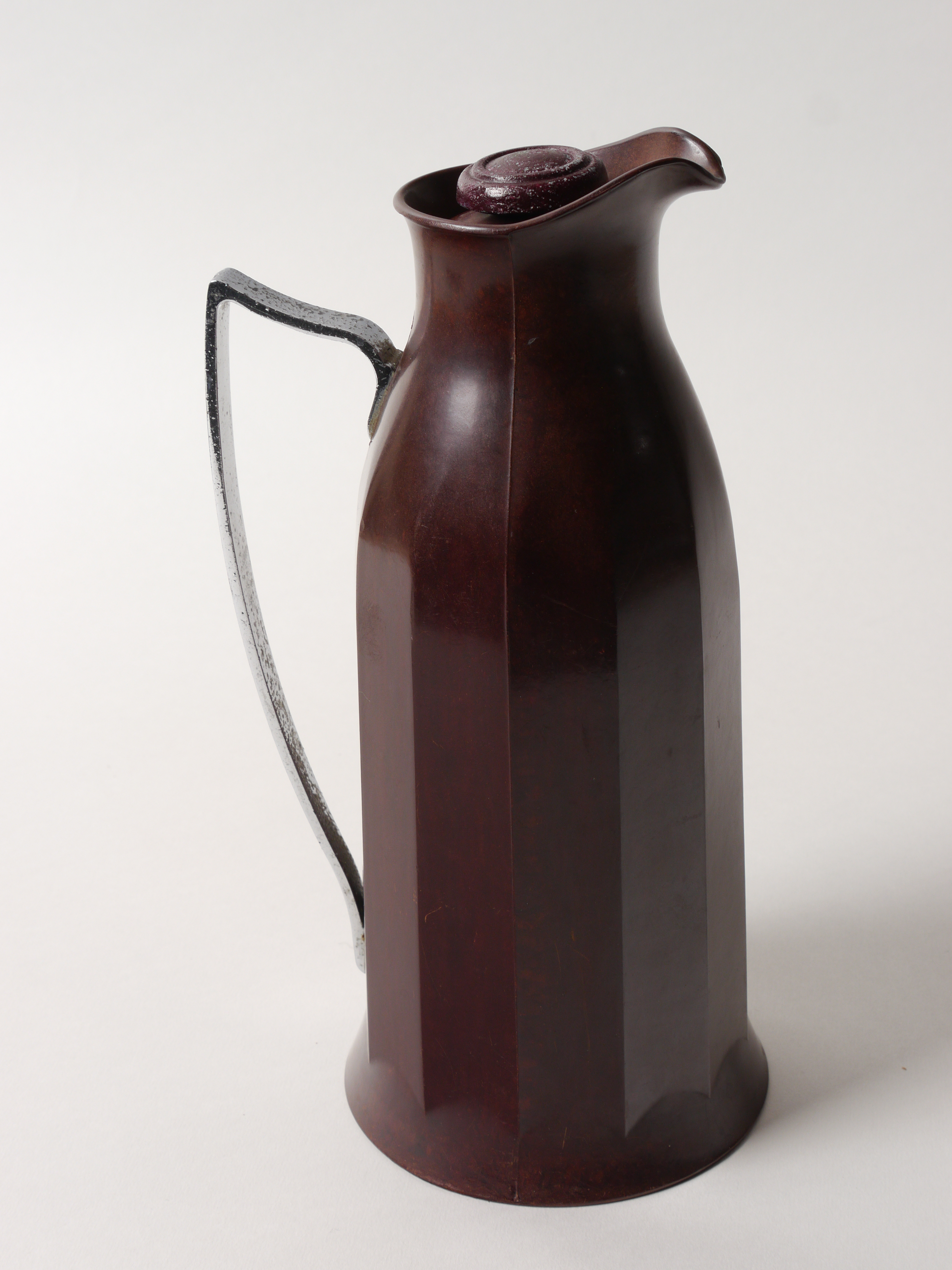
Bakelite Thermos flask in the collection of the Museum of Industry (Ghent, Belgium)

Dewar's design was quickly transformed into a commercial item in 1904 as two German glassblowers, Reinhold Burger and Albert Aschenbrenner, discovered that it could be used to keep cold drinks cold and warm drinks warm and invented a more robust flask design, which was suited for everyday use. The Dewar flask design had never been patented but the German men who discovered the commercial use for the product named it Thermos, and subsequently claimed both the rights to the commercial product and the trademark to the name. In his subsequent attempt to claim the rights to the invention, Dewar instead lost a court case to the company. The manufacturing and performance of the Thermos bottle was significantly improved and refined by the Viennese inventor and merchant Gustav Robert Paalen, who designed various types for domestic use, which he also patented, and distributed widely, through the Thermos Bottle Companies in the United States, Canada and the UK, which bought licences for respective national markets. The American Thermos Bottle Company built up a mass production in Norwich, CT, which brought prices down and enabled the wide distribution of the product for at-home use. Over time, the company expanded the size, shapes and materials of these consumer products, primarily used for carrying coffee on the go and carrying liquids on camping trips to keep them either hot or cold. Eventually other manufacturers produced similar products for consumer use.

The term "thermos" became a household name for vacuum flasks in general. As of 2023, Thermos and THERMOS remain a registered trademark in some countries, including the United States, but the lowercase "thermos" was declared a genericized trademark by court action in the United States in 1963.

== Design ==
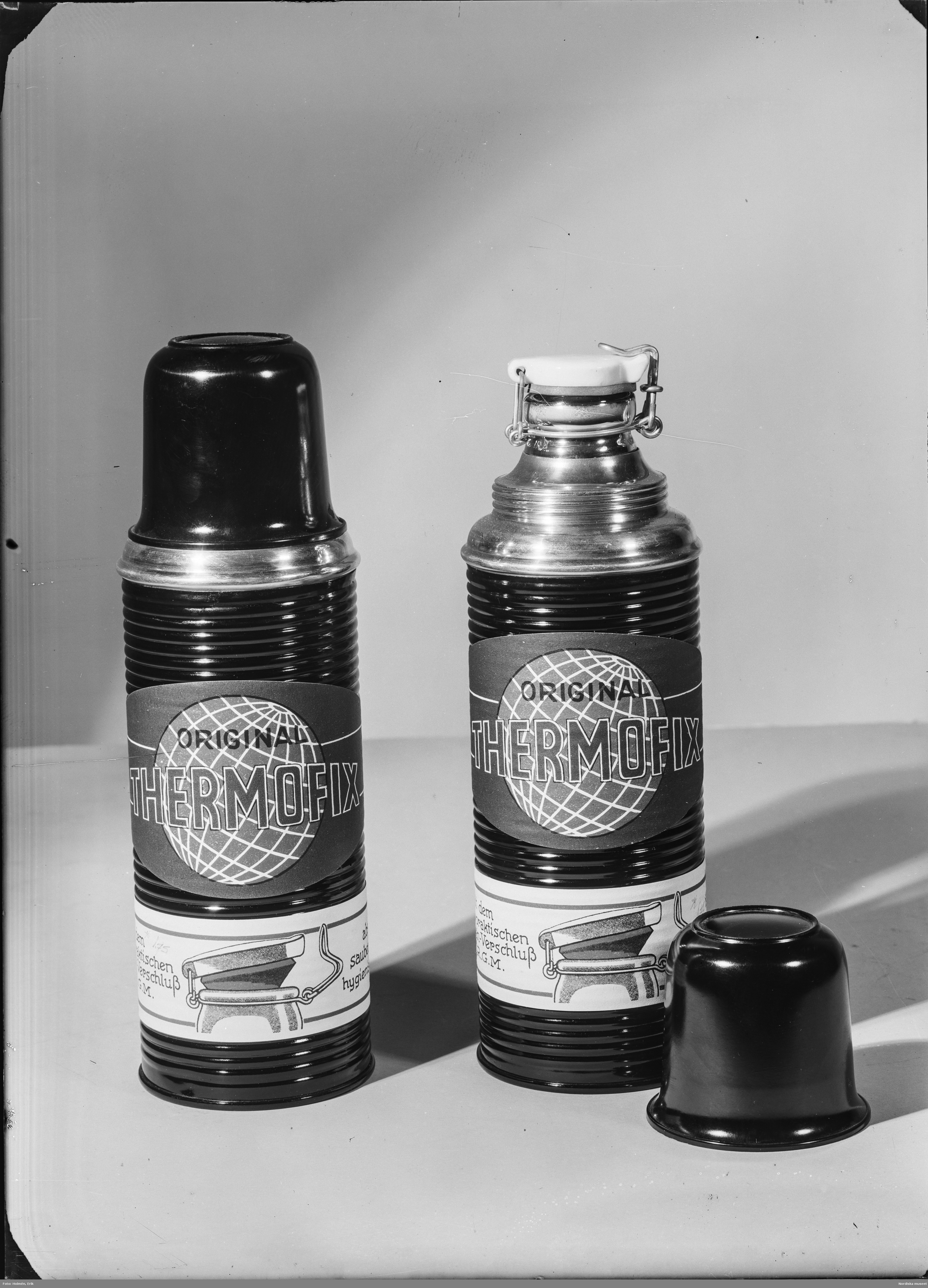
1930s "Thermofix" vacuum flask

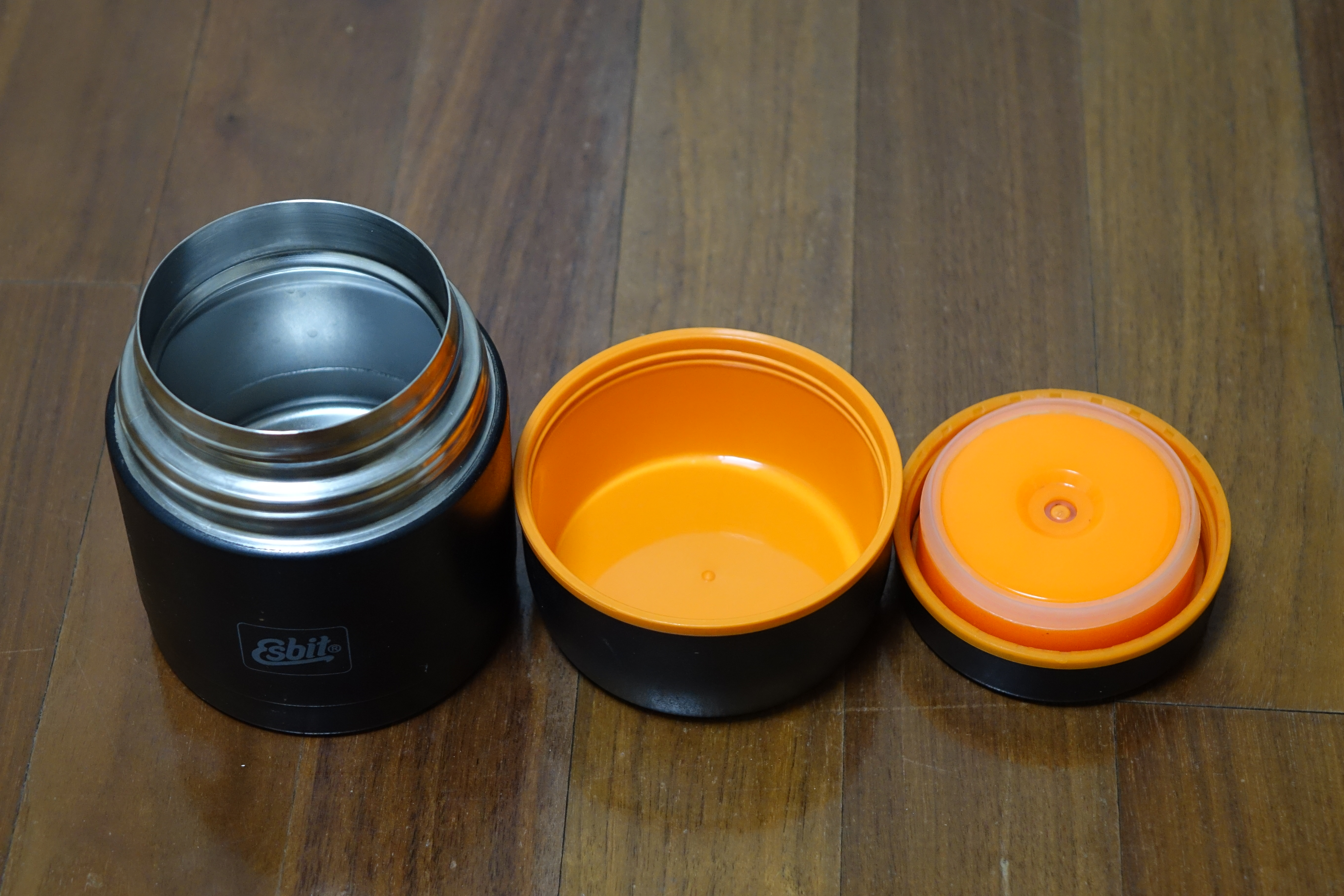
A low, wide opening design

The vacuum flask consists of two vessels, one placed within the other and joined at the neck. The gap between the two vessels is partially evacuated of air, creating a partial-vacuum which reduces heat conduction or convection. Heat transfer by thermal radiation may be minimized by silvering flask surfaces facing the gap but can become problematic if the flask's contents or surroundings are very hot; hence vacuum flasks usually hold contents below the boiling point of water. Most heat transfer occurs through the neck and opening of the flask, where there is no vacuum. Vacuum flasks are usually made of metal, borosilicate glass, foam or plastic and have their opening stoppered with cork or polyethylene plastic. Vacuum flasks are often used as insulated shipping containers.

Extremely large or long vacuum flasks sometimes cannot fully support the inner flask from the neck alone, so additional support is provided by spacers between the interior and exterior shell. These spacers act as a thermal bridge and partially reduce the insulating properties of the flask around the area where the spacer contacts the interior surface.

Several technological applications, such as NMR and MRI machines, rely on the use of double vacuum flasks. These flasks have two vacuum sections. The inner flask contains liquid helium and the outer flask contains liquid nitrogen, with one vacuum section in between. The loss of precious helium is limited in this way.

Other improvements to the vacuum flask include the vapour-cooled radiation shield and the vapour-cooled neck, both of which help to reduce evaporation from the flask.

== Research and industry ==
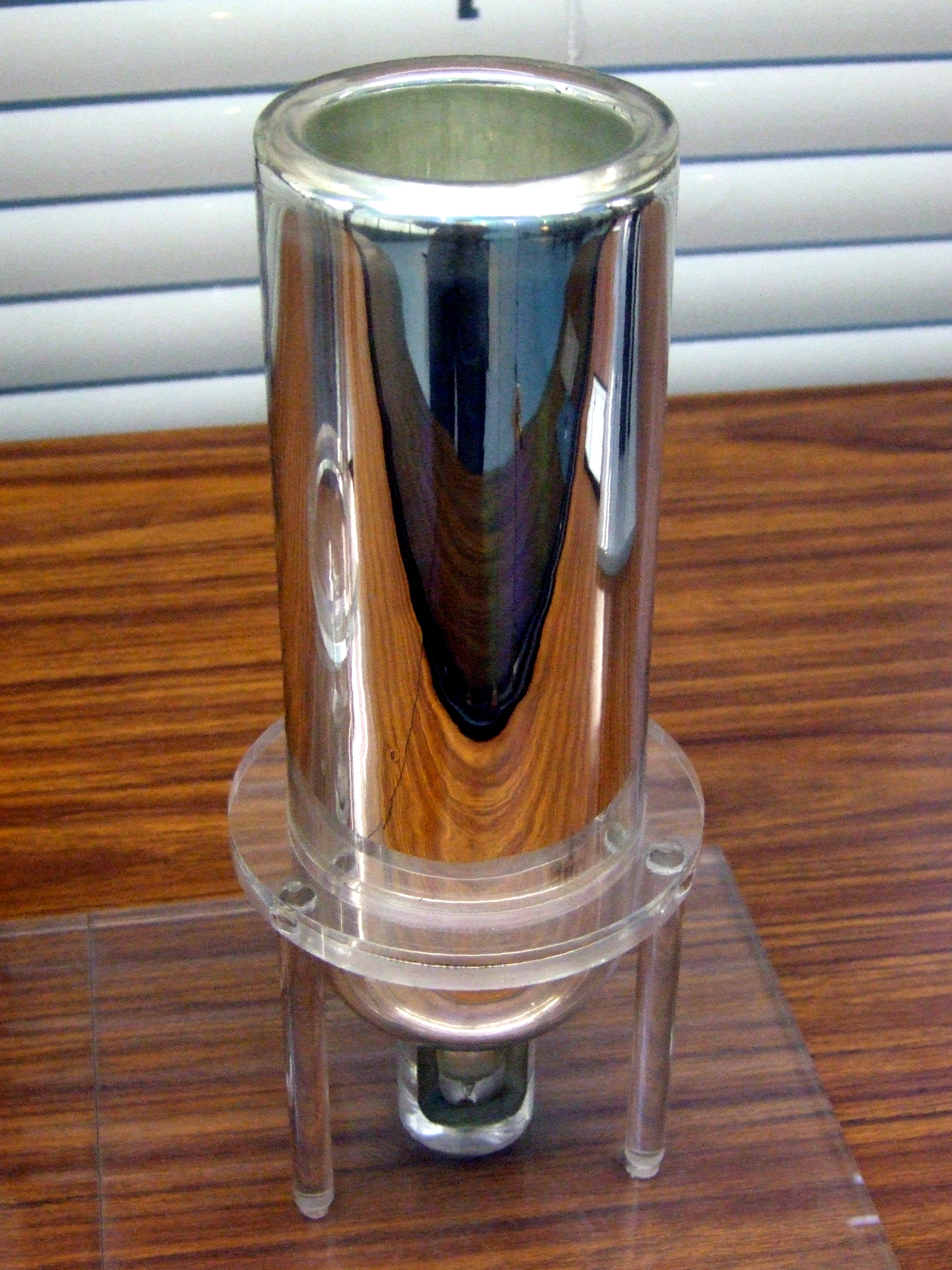
Laboratory Dewar flask, Deutsches Museum, Munich

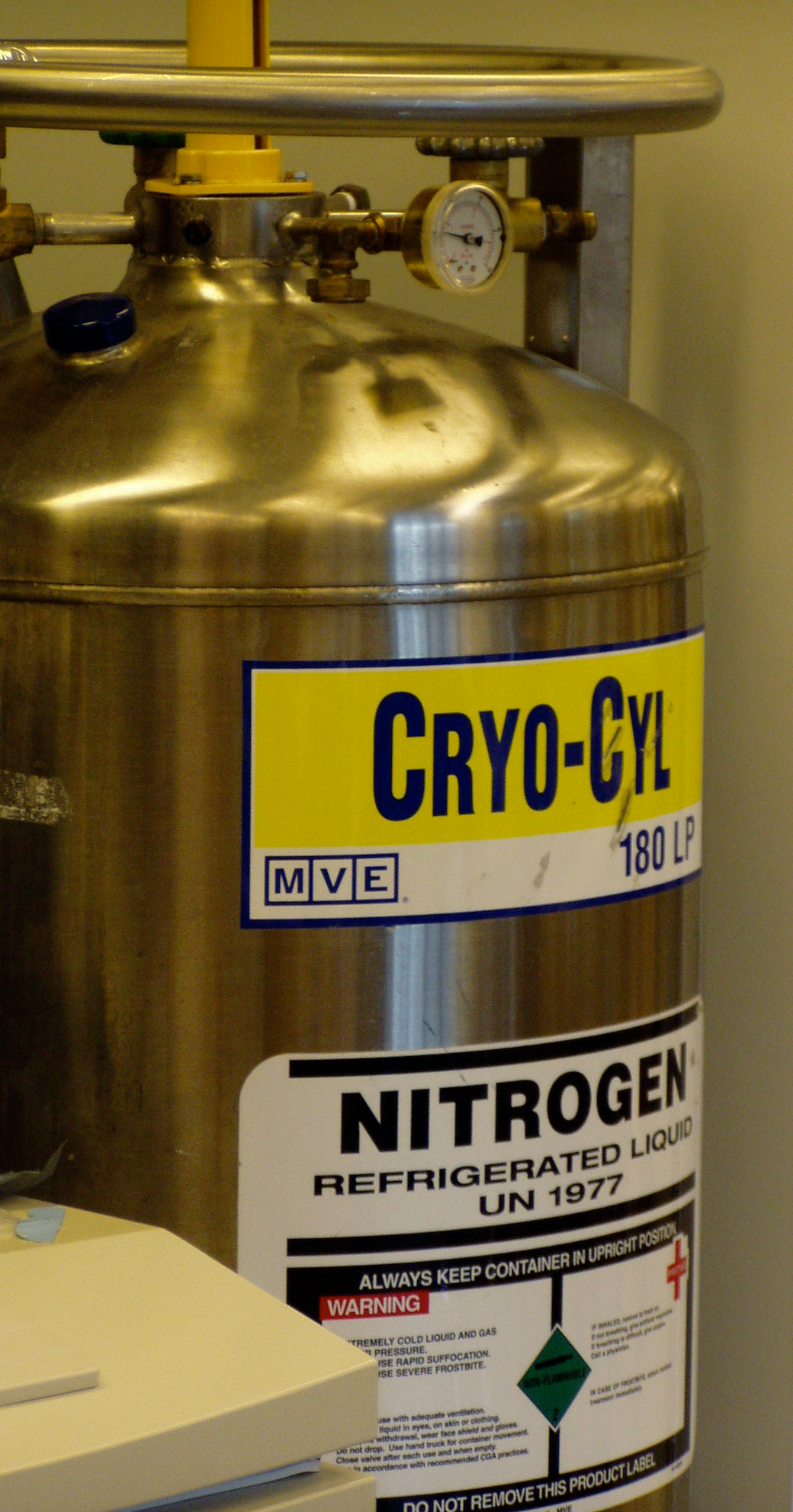
A cryogenic storage dewar of liquid nitrogen, used to supply a cryogenic freezer

In laboratories and industry, vacuum flasks are often used to hold liquefied gases (commonly liquid nitrogen with a boiling point of 77 K) for flash freezing, sample preparation and other processes where creating or maintaining an extreme low temperature is desired. Larger vacuum flasks store liquids that become gaseous at well below ambient temperature, such as oxygen and nitrogen; in this case the leakage of heat into the extremely cold interior of the bottle results in a slow boiling-off of the liquid so that a narrow unstoppered opening, or a stoppered opening protected by a pressure relief valve, is necessary to prevent pressure from building up and eventually shattering the flask. The insulation of the vacuum flask results in a very slow "boil" and thus the contents remain liquid for long periods without refrigeration equipment.

Vacuum flasks have been used to house standard cells and ovenized Zener diodes, along with their printed circuit board, in precision voltage-regulating devices used as electrical standards. The flask helped with controlling the Zener temperature over a long time span and was used to reduce variations of the output voltage of the Zener standard owing to temperature fluctuation to within a few parts per million.

One notable use was by Guildline Instruments, of Canada, in their Transvolt, model 9154B, saturated standard cell, which is an electrical voltage standard. Here a silvered vacuum flask was encased in foam insulation and, using a large glass vacuum plug, held the saturated cell. The output of the device was 1.018 volts and was held to within a few parts per million.

The principle of the vacuum flask makes it ideal for storing certain types of rocket fuel, and NASA used it extensively in the propellant tanks of the Saturn launch vehicles in the 1960s and 1970s.

The design and shape of the Dewar flask was used as a model for optical experiments based on the idea that the shape of the two compartments with the space in between is similar to the way the light hits the eye. The vacuum flask has also been part of experiments using it as the capacitor of different chemicals in order to keep them at a consistent temperature.

The industrial Dewar flask is the base for a device used to passively insulate medical shipments. Most vaccines are sensitive to heat and require a cold chain system to keep them at stable, near freezing temperatures. The Arktek device uses eight one-litre ice blocks to hold vaccines at under 10 °C.

In the oil and gas industry, Dewar flasks are used to insulate the electronic components in wireline logging tools. Conventional logging tools (rated to 350 °F) are upgraded to high-temperature specifications by installing all sensitive electronic components in a Dewar flask.

== Safety ==
Vacuum flasks are at risk of implosion hazard, and glass vessels under vacuum, in particular, may shatter unexpectedly. Chips, scratches or cracks can be a starting point for dangerous vessel failure, especially when the vessel temperature changes rapidly (when hot or cold liquid is added). Proper preparation of the Dewar vacuum flask by tempering prior to use is advised to maintain and optimize the functioning of the unit. Glass vacuum flasks are usually fitted into a metal base with the cylinder contained in or coated with mesh, aluminum or plastic to aid in handling, protect it from physical damage, and contain fragments should they break.

In addition, cryogenic storage dewars are usually pressurized, and they may explode if pressure relief valves are not used.

Thermal expansion has to be taken into account when engineering a vacuum flask. The outer and inner walls are exposed to different temperatures and will expand at different rates. The vacuum flask can rupture due to the differential in thermal expansion between the outer and inner walls. Expansion joints are commonly used in tubular vacuum flasks to avoid rupture and maintain vacuum integrity.

== See also ==
- Hermetic seal – Airtight seal
- James Webb Space Telescope sunshield – Main cooling system for the infrared observatory
- Tervis Tumbler – American drinkware manufacturer
- Thermal cooking – Cooking method
- Yeti Holdings – American manufacturing company
- Cooler – Insulated box used to keep food or drink cool
