= Synthetic paper =

Material similar to paper made out of synthetic resin

Synthetic paper is a type of paper-like material (Note: Paper is defined as a mesh of cellulose fibers. Without cellulose content, a paper-like material is not 'true' paper, but may colloquially be called paper, or marketed as such.) made from synthetic resin. Synthetic papers can be highly water-resistant, flexible, durable and tear-resistant. Synthetic paper is usually made out of either biaxially oriented polypropylene (BOPP) or high-density polyethylene (HDPE).

The market for synthetic paper includes packaged food and beverage consumption, use as label paper, and the cosmetics industry.

== Types of synthetic paper ==
=== Stone paper ===
Stone paper is a synthetic paper consisting largely of calcium carbonate.
