= Home medical equipment =

Type of medical equipment

This article discusses the definitions and types of home medical equipment (HME), also known as durable medical equipment (DME), and durable medical equipment and prosthetics and orthotics (DMEPOS).

== HME / DMEPOS ==
Home medical equipment is a category of devices used for patients whose care is being managed from a home or other private facility managed by a nonprofessional caregiver or family member. It is often referred to as "durable" medical equipment (DME) as it is intended to withstand repeated use by non-professionals or the patient, and is appropriate for use in the home.

Medical supplies of an expendable nature, such as bandages, rubber gloves and irrigating kits are not considered by Medicare to be DME.

Within the US medical and insurance industries, the following acronyms are used to describe home medical equipment:

- DME: Durable Medical Equipment
- HME: Home Medical Equipment
- DMEPOS: Durable Medical Equipment, Prosthetics, Orthotics and Supplies

== Types of home medical equipment ==
The following are representative examples of home medical equipment

- Air ionizer
- Air purifier
- Apnea monitor
- Artificial limb
- Bedpan
- Cannula
- Catheter
- Colostomy bag
- CPAP machine
- Crutch
- Diabetic Shoes
- Drug test
- Enemas
- Feeding tube
- Glucose meter
- Heating pad
- Hospital bed
- Infusion pump
- Lift chair
- Nasal cannula
- Nebulizer
- Oxygen concentrator
- Oxygen cylinder
- Patient lift
- Pill splitter
- Prosthetic device
- Pulse oximeter
- Traction splint
- Walker
- Ventilator
- Wheelchair

== Obtaining and using home medical equipment ==
For most home medical equipment to be reimbursed by insurance, a patient must have a doctor's prescription for the equipment needed. Some equipment, such as oxygen, is FDA regulated and must be prescribed by a physician before purchase whether insurance reimbursed or otherwise.

The physician may recommend a supplier for the home medical equipment, or the patient will have to research this on their own. HME / DMEPOS suppliers are located throughout the country and some specialty shops can also be found on the internet.

There is no established typical size for HME / DMEPOS suppliers. Supply companies include very large organizations such as Walgreens, Lincare, and Apria to smaller local companies operated by sole proprietors or families. A new evolution in the home medical equipment arena is the advent of internet retailers who have lower operating costs so they often sell equipment for lower prices than local "brick and mortar", but lack the ability to offer in-home setup, equipment training and customer service. In all cases, however, there are strict rules and laws governing HME / DMEPOS suppliers that participate in Medicare and Medicaid programs. In addition to rules outlined the National Supplier Clearinghouse, of division of CMS (centers for Medicare and Medicaid), all Medicare DME suppliers must obtain and maintain accreditation by one of many approved accrediting bodies.

Once a patient or caregiver selects an appropriate HME / DMEPOS supplier, he/she presents the supplier with the prescription and patient's insurance information. HME / DMEPOS suppliers maintain an inventory of products and equipment, so fulfillment of the prescription is rapid, much like a Pharmacy.

The HME / DMEPOS supplier is obligated to perform certain functions when providing home medical equipment. These include:

- Proper delivery and setup of the equipment
- Ensuring the home environment is suitable and safe for proper usage of the equipment
- Training the patient, family and caregivers on the proper usage and maintenance of the equipment
- Informing the patient and/or caregiver of their rights and responsibilities

All HME / DMEPOS suppliers are required to comply with Health Insurance Portability and Accountability Act (HIPAA) to protect patients' confidentiality and records.

== Insurance ==
=== In the United States ===
Home medical equipment is typically covered by patient's healthcare insurance, including Medicare (Part B). In order to properly code home medical equipment for billing, the Healthcare Common Procedure Coding System HCPCS is utilized. As of 2014, under the Medicare Prescription Drug, Improvement, and Modernization Act of 2003, providers of HME/DMEPOS will be required to become third-party accredited to standards regulated by the Centers for Medicare and Medicaid Services (CMS) in order to continue eligibility under Medicare Part B. This effort aims to standardize and improve the quality of service to patients provided by home medical equipment suppliers.

== See also ==
- Medical device
- Medical technology
- Medical equipment
- Loan closet
- Medtrade- the largest international trade fair for HME in the US
