= Angerhof =

Coordinates: 48.1343°N 11.5708°E

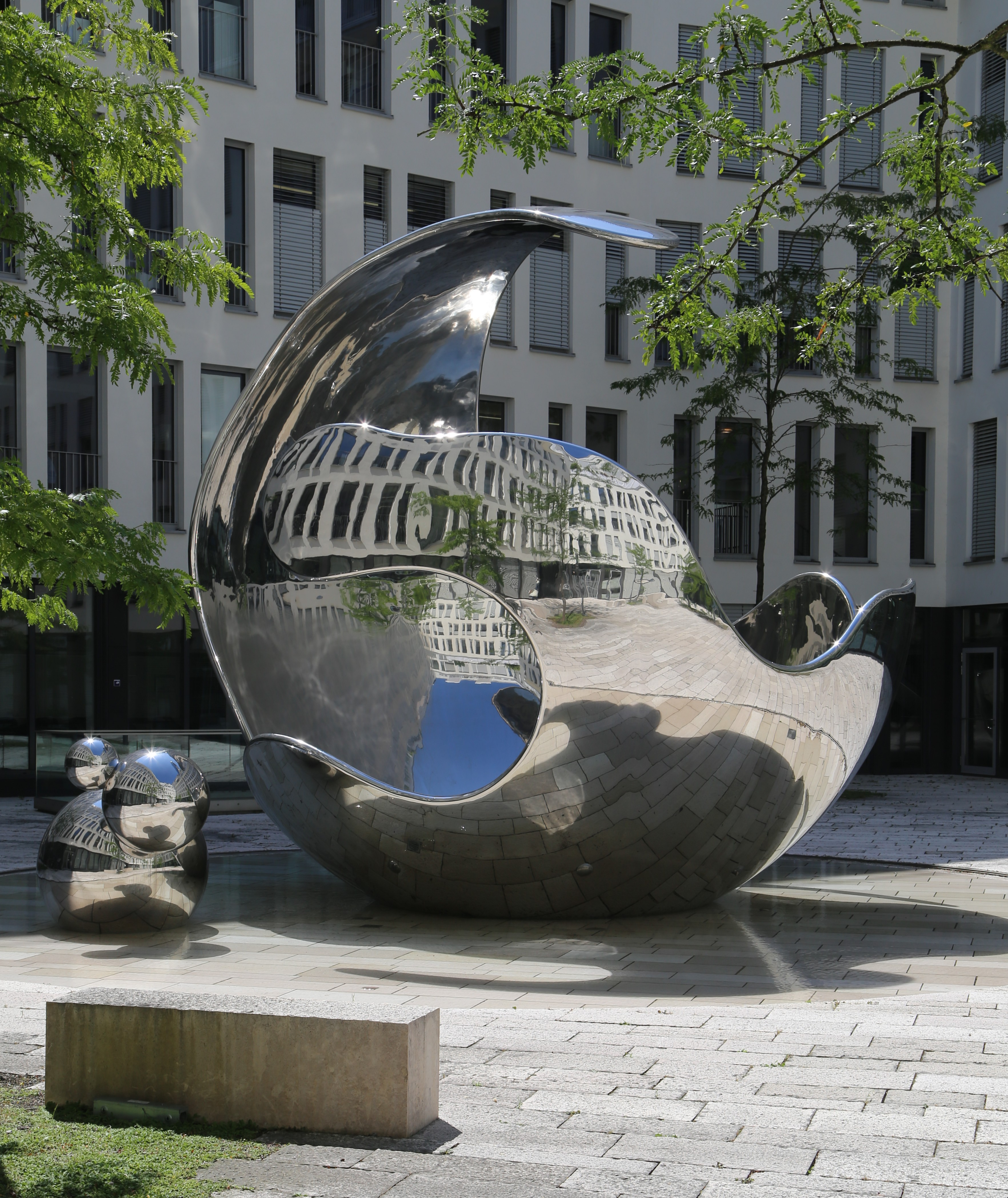
Airborne (2008) by Christopher Klein

The Angerhof is a building in Munich that serves as a residential building, office building, hotel with restaurant, service location and parking garage.

== Location ==
The location of the property is the street Oberanger near the Marienplatz and the Viktualienmarkt, between Munich's oldest monastery St. Anna and the new Jewish center on St-Jakobs-Platz. The nearest stops of the U-/S-Bahn are the Munich Marienplatz station and the subway station Sendlinger Tor.

== Architecture ==
The Angerhof combines, in its horizontal construction, the classic uses of traditional European townhouses for living, working and going out. On the ground floor there are retail stores and restaurants, in the floors above it are offices and in the fifth and sixth levels, on a total of 4,000 square meters, condominiums were created – with three-meter-high ceilings and roof terraces of up to 100 square meters. The interior architecture is reflected in its technically elaborate facade. Behind the sand-colored terracotta façade, light artist Ingo Maurer installed digitally programmed "façade glow" made up of energy-optimized LED lights. The Angerhof created a 1,000-square-meter inner courtyard for the public that opens directly onto the newly created pedestrian zone on the lower Anger.

== Construction and dates ==
Construction began in 2005 according to the plans of architects Otto Steidle and Johann Spengler. The topping out ceremony took place in 2007 and the completion of the approx. 38,000 square meter floor spaced property was in 2009. The total construction costs amounted to approx. 150 million Euros.

The place where the Angerhof stands today, was known for a long time in the post-war period as an "urban lumber pile". A post-war car park made of raw concrete with a gas station blocked the development plans of city construction advocate Christiane Thalgott for a long time. Lord Mayor Christian Ude (SPD) had not expected an urban construction before 2037, since that was how long the leasehold guaranteed of the parking garage existed. A solution was found when the Wöhr + Bauer GmbH managing director Wolfgang Roeck made the suggestion at the turn of the millennium to place the parking garage at the same place in an underground car park. Following the architectural competition for the Angerhof, the planning for the "Boulangerie Oberanger" followed from July to December 2003 - together by the construction department, planning department, district committee (BA) and the builder of the Angerhof, Wöhr + Bauer. On 17 February 2004, the BA, headed by Wolfgang Püschel, decided on the design from "real green" landscape architects. In May 2005, the city council approved the overall concept.

== Particularities ==
- Shortly after the start of construction, in 2006, Linde plc, as a tenant, secured almost all the office space for its new corporate headquarters.
- The new building received constant positive responses from the press. Above all, critics welcomed the urban upgrading of the area. For a while, one of the penthouse apartments was considered the "most expensive apartment in Germany" and aroused great media interest.
- In the high garage of the future penthouse apartments, Wöhr + Bauer GmbH put on a multimedia show about the Angers quarter on a 32hektar exhibit for Munich's 850th city birthday.
- Inside the courtyard is a large molecular sculpture by Christopher Klein made out of stainless steel. The production was carried out by the company Sandmeir in Rain am Lech. The largest element of the sculpture has a diameter of over six meters.
- The newly created alley between the Jewish Center and Angerhof is illuminated by two rotating light sculptures from New York artist Keith Sonnier in the colors red and blue.
- The artist Andrea Schmeing-Häusler immersed in the cobblestones at the Angerhof sound stones that allow real church bells to ring through digital technology.

== Architecture Prize ==
Angerhof Munich was nominated for the "MIPIM-Award" 2009 in the category "Business Center" on 12 March 2009, at the international real estate fair MIPIM in Cannes as one of only three buildings.
