= Loan closet =

A loan closet is a program that allows people to borrow durable medical equipment and home medical equipment at no cost or at low cost. The loan closet may be offered through an organization, an individual, or some other entity, often a non-profit organization. Because medical equipment is expensive and often needed for only a short time, loan closets help people receive equipment that they may not otherwise be able to afford.

== Process ==
Typically, a loan closet receives donated equipment from people who no longer need it. The loan closet will then clean and check the equipment and make it available to another person. Depending on the particular loan closet, the equipment may be loaned out for a set period of time, for as long as the person needs it or, in some cases it may be given away. When the equipment is returned, it is cleaned again and checked for safety and is then made available for the next person. The medical equipment available varies from one loan closet to another.

== Clients ==
The requirements to use a loan closet vary. Some loan closets are only available to certain groups of people such as senior citizens or veterans. Others may only serve people with a particular disease or condition, such as ALS, multiple sclerosis, cancer, or cerebral palsy. A person may also need to reside in a particular geographical area, belong to a certain organization, or have an income below a certain level.

== Sponsors ==
Loan closets may be sponsored by churches, synagogues, mosques, temples, senior centers, or fire stations. An individual may also loan out medical equipment on an informal basis. There are many non-profit organizations whose sole purpose is to loan out home medical equipment to those in need.

== Contributions ==
Loan closets are dependent on contributors for the equipment which they lend out. Loan closets can be found through social workers, hospital discharge staff, and physicians' offices. Not all loan closets accept all donations and arrangements may need to be made in advance before donations are accepted.

== See also ==
- Durable medical equipment
- Home medical equipment
