= Certificate of medical necessity =

In the US a certificate of medical necessity is a document required by Centers for Medicare and Medicaid Services to substantiate in detail the medical necessity of an item of durable medical equipment or a service to a Medicare beneficiary. There are different types of CMN for different requirements, e.g., insulin pumps, home health and private duty nursing services, etc.

A CMN typically requires several dates to be specified, such as:

1. The "initial date" of the CMN
2. The "revised date" of the CMN
3. The "recertification" date (usually for oxygen)
4. The date the beneficiary signed it
5. The date the supplier signed it and
6. The date the physician signed it.

== See also ==
- Medical device
- Medical equipment
