= Durable medical equipment =

Category of medical devices

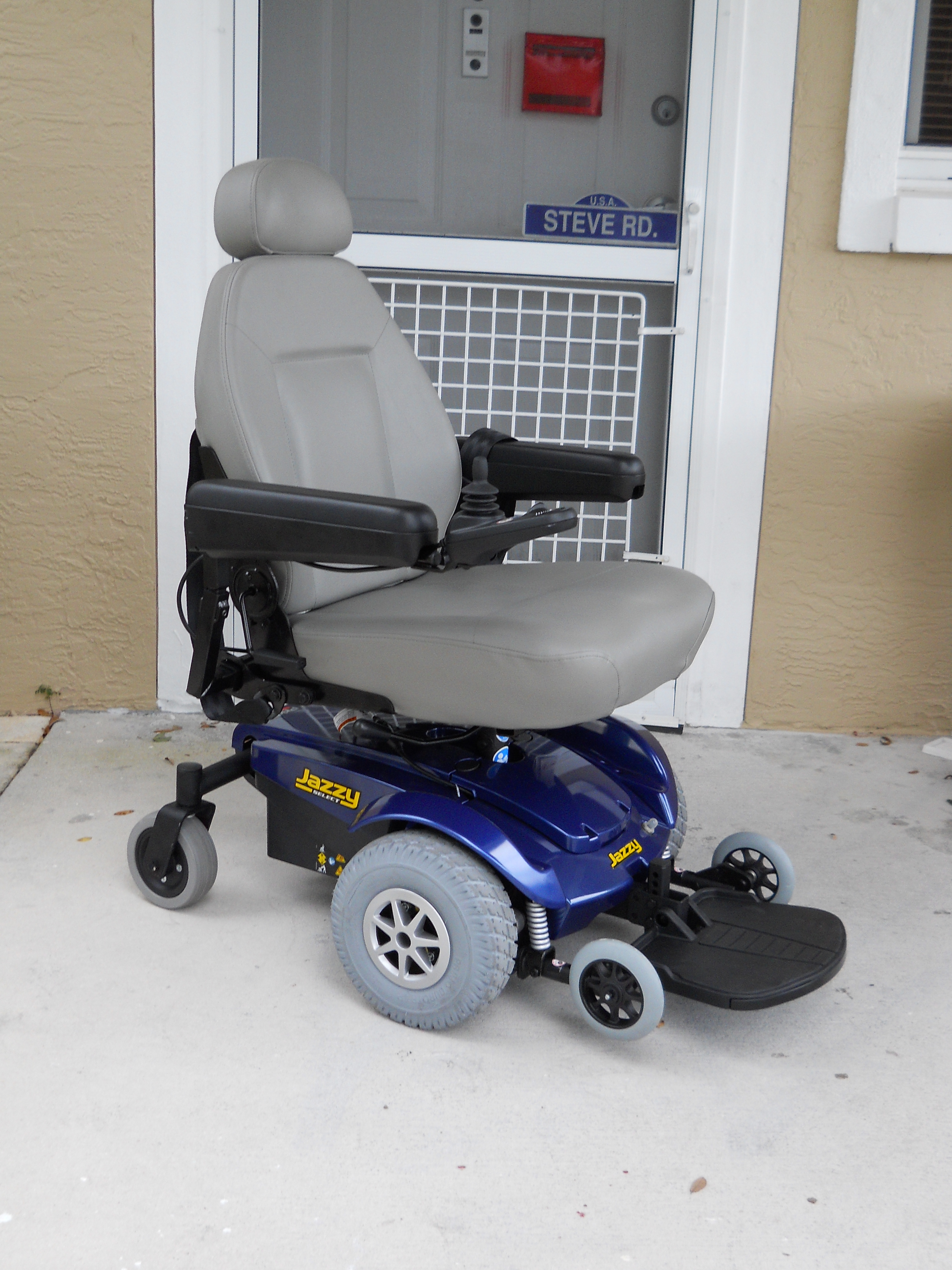
Manual and power wheelchairs are both considered DME

Durable medical equipment (DME) is a category of medical devices designed to assist individuals with disabilities, injuries, or chronic health conditions. These devices are prescribed by healthcare professionals and intended for repeated use over an extended period.

== Definition ==
In the United States, durable medical equipment has a distinct meaning within government healthcare assistance programs including Medicare and the Social Security Administration.

For example, in order for equipment to match Medicare's definition of DME, it must match the following criteria:

- Durable (can withstand repeated use)
- Used for a medical reason
- Typically only useful to someone who is sick or injured
- Used in your home
- Expected to last at least 3 years

Globally, terms such as assisted devices or medical devices are used in such places as the European Union.

=== Examples ===
Oxygen concentrators are the most commonly used DME device within the United States. Other examples include iron lungs, oxygen tents, nebulizers, CPAP, catheters, hospital beds, and wheelchairs.

== Regulation ==
In the U.S., DME is regulated by various government agencies, including the Centers for Medicare & Medicaid Services and the Food and Drug Administration (FDA), which oversees the safety and efficacy of medical devices.

== Market size ==
The global DME market, valued at approximately USD 222.2 billion in 2023, is expected to grow at a compound annual growth rate (CAGR) of 7.3%, reaching an estimated USD 363.0 billion by 2030.

The growing global elderly population has significantly increased the demand for mobility aids and other DME that support independent living. Additionally, the rising prevalence of chronic conditions such as diabetes, respiratory disorders, and cardiovascular diseases has further fueled the need for DME.

== See also ==
- Certificate of medical necessity
- Home medical equipment
- Medical device
- Medical equipment
- Loan closet
