= Lincare Holdings =

American respiratory healthcare company

Lincare Holdings Inc.
- Type: Subsidiary
- Industry: Healthcare
- Predecessor: Linde Homecare Medical Systems
- Founded: 1987; 39 years ago
- Headquarters: 19387 US 19 N, Clearwater, Florida, U.S.
- Number of locations: 700+
- Area served: United States
- Key people: Jeff Barnhard (CEO)
- Products: Home oxygen equipment
- Revenue: US$2,400,000,000 (2024)
- Number of employees: 11000 (2023)
- Parent: Linde plc
- Website: www.lincare.com

Lincare Holdings Inc. is a respiratory healthcare company headquartered in Clearwater, Florida, United States. Lincare is the largest distributor of respiratory homecare equipment in the United States, serving approximately 1.8 million patients nationwide. A subsidiary of Linde plc, Lincare operates from over 700 locations in 49 states across the United States and employs 10,000 people, including 1,300 licensed clinicians. Products and services provided by Lincare include, but are not limited to, oxygen, nebulizers, sleep apnea products, home INR testing, ventilator products, enteral therapy, and homecare respiratory therapy services. Additional products provided by Lincare are durable medical equipment, including wheelchairs, walkers, and hospital beds. It is the largest distributor of home oxygen equipment in the US.

In 2024, ProPublica reported that Lincare had a decades-long history of defrauding Medicare, the health insurance provider responsible for most of Lincare's $2.4 billion in revenue in 2024.

== History ==
Lincare originated from Linde Air Products in the early 20th century under the U.S. subsidiary business of the Linde Group.

In 1879, Carl von Linde founded the Gesellschaft für Linde's Eismaschinen in Wiesbaden, Germany, to sell mechanical refrigeration systems for the brewing and food industries.

In 1907, Carl von Linde traveled to the United States to establish the Linde Air Products in Buffalo, NY, as a subsidiary of Linde.

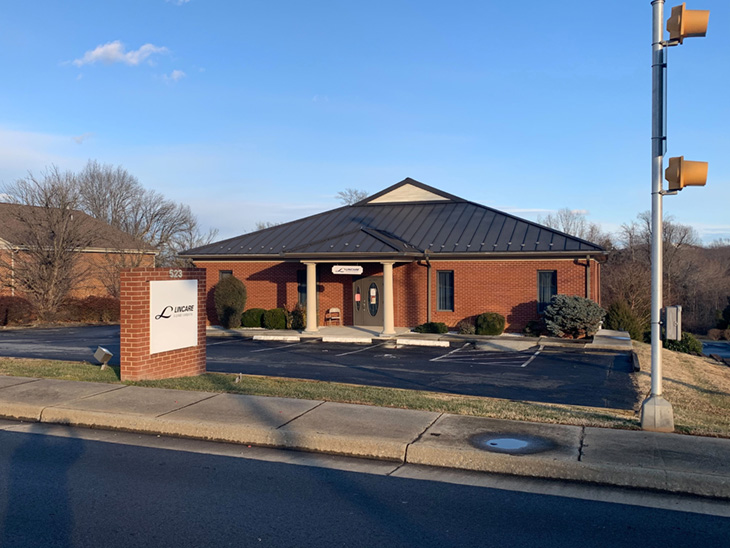
Lincare office in Lynchburg, VA

In 1917, due to the First World War, Linde lost its U.S. subsidiary from expropriation. As a result, Union Carbide Corporation acquired Linde’s U.S. business, formally combining Linde Air Products as a subsidiary of Union Carbide.

In 1972, the precursor to Lincare, Linde Homecare Medical Systems was a unit in Union Carbide’s industrial gasses division.

In 1984, Union Carbide faced financial issues from a significant liability lawsuit in Bhopal, India. As a result of the lawsuit in and a hostile takeover attempt from GAF Corporation, Union Carbide bought back 55 percent of its stock, and in the process, went $3 billion into debt. Union Carbide sold some of its holdings to alleviate debt. At this time, Linde Homecare Medical Systems transitioned into Lincare Inc in 1987.

In 1990, Union Carbide sold its remaining 50 percent equity stake in Lincare Inc., to investors and Lincare executives. The company changed its name to Lincare Holdings.

In 1992, the partner owners of Lincare Holdings took the company public on the NASDAQ under the ticker symbol 'LNCR', and completed its initial public offering, raising $50 million.

Over the next 18 years, Lincare Holdings evolved into one of the largest respiratory therapy providers in the United States, serving more than 800,000 patients in 48 states.

In 2006, the US Department of Health and Human Services (HHS) placed Lincare on the agency's probation list for 5 years for defrauding Medicare. It violated the terms of the corporate integrity agreement.

In 2018, HHS again placed Lincare on the agency's probation list for 5 years. It violated the terms again.

In July 2012, Linde plc reacquired Lincare Holdings for $4.6 billion. By acquiring Lincare, Linde doubled sales in its North American Gases Division.

In 2018, Lincare was accused of violating anti-kickback laws and continuing to bill Medicare for a patient who was already deceased, and settled in court.

In 2023, HHS again placed Lincare on the agency's probation list for 5 years. It violated the terms again. In 2024, Lincare billed Medicare for ventilators they knew customers were no longer using.
