= Medtrade =

- Status: Active
- Genre: Trade show
- Frequency: Annually
- Locations: Dallas, TX
- Participants: 500
- Attendance: 7000
- Area: 145,000 square feet
- Organiser: Emerald Expositions

Medtrade is an international trade conference in the field of medical supplies for the healthcare industry, which after a makeover in 2009 was to focus on advocacy, government affairs and continuing education. Medtrade hosts two events annually in the United States of America on varying dates.

Medtrade serves buyers and sellers of the home health care marketplace. The exposition (exhibit hall) product categories include mobility, respiratory, sleep, rehab products and aids to daily living. Other events within Medtrade include fundraising receptions from organizations for patient advocacy. Medtrade's average exhibit hall size in 2013 was 145,000 square feet, with 500 exhibitors and 7,000 attendees.

Beginning in 2023, the two annual Medtrade East (Atlanta, GA) and Medtrade West (Las Vegas, NV) conferences were consolidated into a single Medtrade conference held annually in Dallas, TX.

== Company history ==
Medtrade originally launched as the National Home Health Care Exposition, a part of the Nielsen Company. Onex Corporation acquired Nielsen Expositions on June 17, 2013, and changed the company name to Emerald Expositions; it owns and operates trade shows in the United States.

== Events ==
- Medtrade 2000, held October 3–5 in the Orange County Convention Center, Florida
- Medtrade 2001, held October 23 – 25 in the Ernest Morial Convention Center, New Orleans, LA
- Medtrade 2002, held October 29–31 in the Georgia World Congress Center, Atlanta, Georgia
- Medtrade 2003, held October 9–11 in the Georgia World Congress Center in Atlanta, GA
- Medtrade 2004, held October 26–28 in the Orange County Convention Center, FL
- Medtrade 2005, held October 18–20 in the Georgia World Congress Center in Atlanta, GA
- Medtrade 2006, held September. 19-21, in the Georgia World Congress Center in Atlanta, GA
- Medtrade 2007, held October 2–4 in the Orange County Convention Center, FL
- Medtrade 2008, held October 27–30, in the Georgia World Congress Center in Atlanta, GA
- Medtrade 2009 held October 13–15 in the Georgia World Congress Center in Atlanta, GA
- Medtrade 2010 held November 16–18, in the Georgia World Congress Center in Atlanta, GA
- Medtrade 2011 held October 25–27, in the Georgia World Congress Center in Atlanta, GA
- Medtrade 2012, held October 16–18, Georgia World Congress Center in Atlanta, GA
- Medtrade 2013, held October 8–10, in the Orange County Convention Center, FL
- Medtrade Spring 2002, held April 22–24, at the Las Vegas Convention Center, Las Vegas, Nevada
- Medtrade Spring 2003, held May 6–8, at the Las Vegas Convention Center, Las Vegas, NV
- Medtrade Spring 2004, held March 16–18, at the Las Vegas Convention Center, Las Vegas, NV
- Medtrade Spring 2005, held April 5–7, at the Las Vegas Convention Center, Las Vegas, NV
- Medtrade Spring 2006, held March 21–23, 2006, at the Las Vegas Convention Center, Las Vegas, NV
- Medtrade Spring 2007, held April 24–26, 2007, at the Las Vegas Convention Center, Las Vegas, NV
- Medtrade Spring 2008, held May 6–8, at the Long Beach Convention Center, Long Beach, California
- Medtrade Spring 2009, held March 25–26, at the Las Vegas Convention Center, Las Vegas, NV
- Medtrade Spring 2010, held May 11–13, at the Las Vegas Convention Center, Las Vegas, NV
- Medtrade Spring 2012, held April 11–12, Sands Expo Center, Las Vegas, NV
- Medtrade 2014, October 21–23, Georgia World Congress Center in Atlanta, GA
- Medtrade 2015, October 27–29, Georgia World Congress Center in Atlanta, GA
- Medtrade 2016, October 30-November 2, Georgia World Congress Center in Atlanta, GA
- Medtrade Spring 2017, held Feb 27 - Mar 1, Mandalay Bay Convention Center, Las Vegas, NV - with Co-Location with Environments for Aging (EFA) Conference and Expo
- Medtrade 2017, October 23–25, 2017 Georgia World Congress Center, Atlanta, GA
- Medtrade Spring 2018, Feb 26-28, 2018 Mandalay Bay Convention Center, Las Vegas, NV
- Medtrade 2018, Oct 16-18, 2018 Georgia World Congress Center, Atlanta, GA
- Medtrade 2019, October 3–6, 2019 Georgia World Congress Center, Atlanta, GA
- Medtrade Spring 2020, March 3–6, 2020 Mandalay Bay, Las Vegas, NV
- Medtrade West 2021, July 12–14, 2021 at the Phoenix Convention Center in Arizona
- Medtrade East 2021, Oct. 18-20, 2021 at the Georgia World Congress Center in Atlanta
- Medtrade West 2022, April 4–6, 2022 at the Phoenix Convention Center
- Medtrade East 2022, Oct 24-26 at the Georgia World Congress Center in Atlanta
- Medtrade 2023, March 28–30, Kay Bailey Hutchison Convention Center, Dallas, TX
- Medtrade 2024, March 26–28, Kay Bailey Hutchison Convention Center, Dallas, TX
