= INR self-monitoring =

- Purpose: self measure their INR (due to anti-coagulation therapy)

INR self-monitoring is the use of a medical kit to measure INR (International Normalized Ratio) levels in combination with anti-coagulation drugs, most commonly warfarin.

== Overview ==
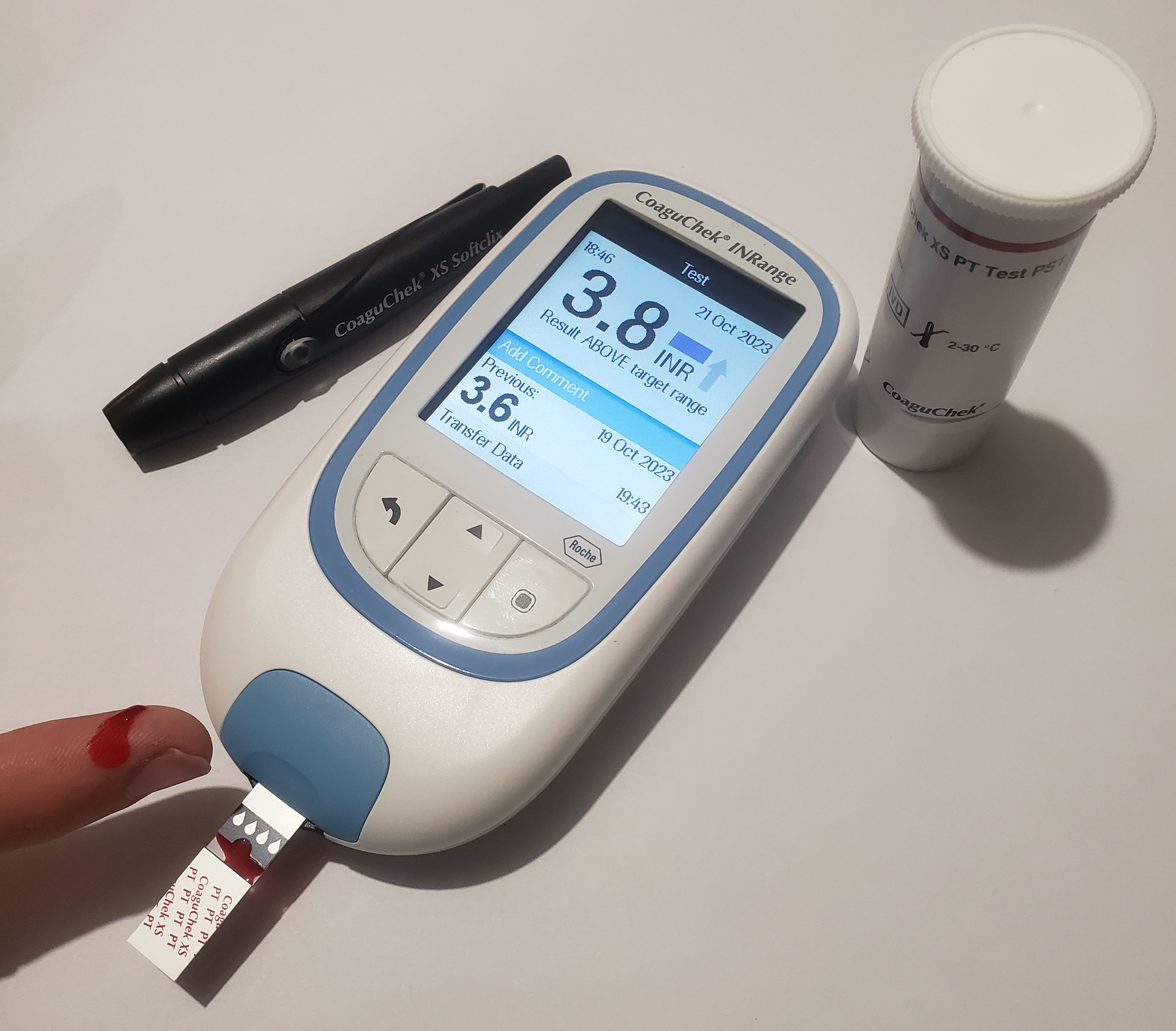
INR self monitoring with one blood drop; in this case, the INR is too high and the warfarin dose must be decreased.

The term "International Normalized Ratio" refers to the measurement used to refer to the prothrombin time (the amount of time the blood takes to form a clot). INR self-monitoring requires the patient to test a drop of blood, drawn from a finger at scheduled times, and record the INR level measured by a monitor.

People on anti-coagulation therapy who are self-testing provide the INR reading they obtain from their monitor to their healthcare professionals at an agreed time, generally by telephone. The healthcare professional decides if any change to the warfarin dose is required and lets the person know what action is needed.

== International Normalized Ratio (INR) ==
International normalized ratio (INR) which is a derivative of prothrombin time is a measurement of blood coagulation in the circulatory system. Both are used to determine the clotting rate of blood, which can be affected by anticoagulant usage, liver damage and Vitamin K levels. The preferred range of INR levels for a patient on anticoagulation therapy is usually between 2 and 3, but it tends to vary depending on the patient's requirements.

== Advantages ==
Patients who self-monitor tend to choose this route for the greater control they feel it gives them over their lives and their condition. This helps to reduce the number of visits being made to their anticoagulation clinic for routine appointments to measure their INR levels. This is a lengthy process in comparison to self-testing and management. Results of clinical studies, which have been recognized by the National Patients Safety Authority (NPSA), show that people who self-monitor keep more frequently within their therapeutic range and have fewer complications including clots and bleeding, compared with people who have their INR levels tested only at their anticoagulation clinic. Self-monitoring may be a more convenient option for those who cannot or do not want to make frequent hospital visits.

== Clinical trials ==
In the past 5 years, there have been a number of clinical trials to highlight the advantages of self-monitoring, whether self-testing or self-managing. It also gives an indication of what improvements the self-testing and self-management can do to INR levels.

=== Clinical reports about INR self-monitoring ===
"Quality of life changed in a positive way. Independence and better organisation of vacation and spare time were most frequently mentioned advantages."

Extract from a study into the impact of self-monitoring on the quality of life of patients under anticoagulation therapy.

"Patient self-testing . . . is an effective method of monitoring oral anticoagulation therapy, providing outcomes at least as good as, and possibly better than, those achieved with an anti-coagulation clinic."

From international consensus guidelines prepared by the International Self-Monitoring Association for Oral Anti-coagulation.

"Self-monitoring can improve the quality of oral anti-coagulation therapy, with patients more frequently in the therapeutic range, while improving benefits and decreasing harm."

From the conclusions of a review of studies of self-monitoring in oral anti-coagulation therapy.

The results of the study Effect of Home Testing of International Normalized Ratio on Clinical Events (2010), comparing whether weekly home-testing of the INR-level offers any advantage over monthly testing in a clinic, reduces the risk of a major hemorrhage event (i.e. stroke, major bleeding, or death), indicated that the time to the first primary-event (stroke, major bleeding, or death) was not significantly longer in the self-testing group of patients than in the clinic-testing group of patients (hazard ratio, 0.88; 95% confidence interval, 0.75 to 1.04; p=0.14). The study was a prospective, randomized, non-blinded trial for which the patients were randomized into two groups, (i) weekly INR self-testing and (ii) monthly INR clinic-testing, using a stratified method of adaptive-allocation that was determined according to the duration of anti-coagulation and the indication for Warfarin. Although the study was non-blinded, blinding is less critical because the objective outcomes of the study: stroke, major bleeding episode, and death.

== Monitors ==
Patients who are self-monitoring have to use a monitor in order to measure their INR level. Brands of INR monitors include the CoaguChek XS, MicroINR., INRatio2, and QLabs

== See also ==
- International Normalized Ratio
- Warfarin
