= Seal (mechanical) =

Device to prevent fluid leaks in mechanisms

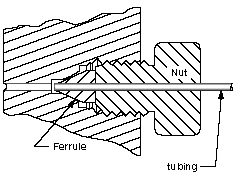
Compression seal example

A seal is a device or material that helps join systems, mechanisms, or materials together to contain pressure, prevent leakage of fluid (e.g. in a pumping system), or exclude contamination. The effectiveness of a seal depends on compression in the case of gaskets and adhesion in the case of sealants. Seals are installed in pumps in a wide range of industries including chemicals, water supply, paper production, food processing, and many other applications.

A stationary seal may also be referred to as a "packing".

Seal types:

== Seals relying on compression ==
- Closure (container)
  - Crown cork, a.k.a. bottle cap
  - Lid
- Compression fitting
- Compression seal fitting
- Diaphragm seal
- Double seam, the crimped seal used in canning
- End-face mechanical seal
- Face seal
- Gasket or mechanical packing
  - Flange gasket
- Hose coupling
- Inflatable seal, a seal that inflates and deflates in three basic directions of operation: the axial direction, the radial-in direction, and the radial-out direction. Each of these inflation directions has its own set of performance parameters for measurements such as the height of inflation and the center-line bend radius that the seal can negotiate. Inflatable seals can be used for numerous applications with difficult sealing issues.
- Obturating ring
- Piston ring
- Radial shaft seal
- Stopper (plug), a.k.a. bung or cork
  - Drain plug
  - Laboratory rubber stopper
- Washer
  - Bodok seal, a specialized gas sealing washer for medical applications
  - Bonded seal, also known as Dowty seal or Dowty washer. A type of washer with integral gasket, widely used to provide a seal at the entry point of a screw or bolt
  - O-ring
  - O-ring boss seal
- Stuffing box (mechanical packing)
- Wiper seal
- Split seal, multi-part seals that offer easier installation and maintenance
- Bridgman seal, a piston sealing mechanism that creates a high-pressure reservoir from a lower pressure source

== Seals relying on fusion or adhesive bonding ==
- Glass-ceramic-to-metal seals
- Glass-to-metal seal
- Heat seal
- Hermetic seal
- Induction sealing or cap sealing
- Putty
- Sealant or adhesive
- Soldering and brazing
- Welding

== Seals made by liquids blocking gases ==
- Ferrofluidic seal
- Trap (plumbing) or siphon trap

== Non-contact seals ==
- Dry gas seal
- Hydrodynamic seal
- Hydrostatic seal
- Labyrinth seal, a seal which creates a tortuous path for the escaping gas or liquid

== See also ==
- Joining technology
- Leak
