= Wiper seal =

Mechanical seal

A wiper seal is an axial seal that creates a seal while allowing a reciprocating shaft to pass through the seal's inner bore. Wiper seals are often used for fluid containment and to prevent dirt from entering a reciprocating shaft mechanism.

Wiper seals are typically used on hydraulic and pneumatic cylinders, as well as telescopic suspension forks for motorcycles and bicycles.

== See also ==
- Gland (engineering)
- Stuffing box
