= Inflatable seal =

Rubber seal used for gaps of varying size

An inflatable seal is a type of rubber seal that inflates and deflates based on the presence of an inflation source. This allows the seal to accommodate a variable sealing gap. When pressure is applied internally to the seal, it inflates to conform to uneven surfaces and provides a reliable barrier from moisture, damp and other contaminants.

== How It Works ==
An inflatable seal can be moulded into a concave, flat or convoluted configuration. Once an inflatable medium is placed between the seal and the force, the seal expands and rounds out to create a firm barrier between a mounting and striking surface. The inflatable seal is uniquely designed to return to its original state once the source of inflation has been removed. This lets the technician move both the seal and the other object freely.

== Applications ==
Inflatable seals can be utilized in an array of industries like electrical, environmental and the military to assist in the following applications to:

1. Squeeze to assist in the movement of materials
2. Produce a mechanical holding force
3. Stop equipment without damaging it
4. Push objects with any degree of force
5. Grip, hold, and lift objects while having the ability to retract the seal out of the way when deflated.
6. Seal off one environment

Different seal profiles will be used depending on the application. Common profiles include Castellated Profiles, Frog-leg Profiles, Footed Snap Profiles, Stem/Foot Profiles and Channel-fit Profiles. The choice of profile depends on the speed with which the seal must be sealed and unsealed, the pressure it is expected to withstand, and the distance and shape of the sealing gap.

== Materials Used ==
Many elastomers are combined to create an inflatable seal. Some of the more commonly used materials are:

1. EPDM
2. Silicone
3. Viton

The following fabrics can be used to reinforce the seal:

1. Dacron
2. Kevlar
3. Nomex
4. Nylon
