= Structural support =

Part of a structure that provides stiffness and strength

A structural support is a part of a building or structure that provides the necessary stiffness and strength in order to resist the internal forces (vertical forces of gravity and lateral forces due to wind and earthquakes) and guide them safely to the ground. External loads (actions of other bodies) that act on buildings cause internal forces (forces and couples by the rest of the structure) in building support structures. Supports can be either at the end or at any intermediate point along a structural member or a constituent part of a building and they are referred to as connections, joints or restraints.

Building support structures, no matter what materials are used, have to give accurate and safe results. A structure depends less on the weight and stiffness of a material and more on its geometry for stability. Whatever the condition is, a specific rigidity is necessary for connection designs. The support connection type has effects on the load bearing capacity of each element, which makes up a structural system. Each support condition influences the behaviour of the elements and therefore, the system. Structures can be either Horizontal-span support systems (floor and roof structures) or Vertical building structure systems (walls, frames, cores, etc.)

== Structure ==
Structure is necessary for buildings but architecture, as an idea, does not require structure. Every building has both load-bearing structures and non-load bearing portions. Structural members form systems and transfer the loads that are acting upon the structural systems, through a series of elements to the ground. Building Structure Elements include Line (beams, columns, cables, frames or arches, space frames, surface elements (walls, slab or shells) and Freeform.

The structure's functional requirements will narrow the possible forms that one can consider. Other factors such as the availability of materials, foundation conditions, the aesthetic requirements and economic limitations also play important roles in establishing the structural form. Structural systems or all their members and parts are considered to be in equilibrium if the systems are initially at rest and remain at rest when a system of forces and couples acts on them. They are not aspects of a model that should be guessed. To be able to analyze a structure, it is necessary to be clear about the forces that can be quite complicated.

There are two types of forces, External Forces which are the actions of other bodies on the structure under consideration and Internal Forces which the rest of the structure exert on a member or portion of the structure as forces and couples. A little deflection or play is required for a structure to protect other surrounding materials from those forces.

== Support structure ==
There are five basic idealized support structure types, categorized by the types of deflection they constrain: roller, pinned, fixed, hanger and simple support.

=== Roller supports ===
A roller support allows thermal expansion and contraction of the span and prevents damage on other structural members such as a pinned support. The typical application of roller supports is in large bridges. In civil engineering, roller supports can be seen at one end of a bridge.

A roller support cannot prevent translational movements in horizontal or lateral directions and any rotational movement but prevents vertical translations. Its reaction force is a single linear force perpendicular to, and away from, the surface (upward or downward). This support type is assumed to be capable of resisting normal displacement.

It can be rubber bearings, rocker or a set of gears allowing a limited amount of lateral movement. A structure on roller skates, for example, remains in place as long as it must only support itself. As soon as lateral load pushes on the structure, a structure on roller skates will roll away in response to the force.

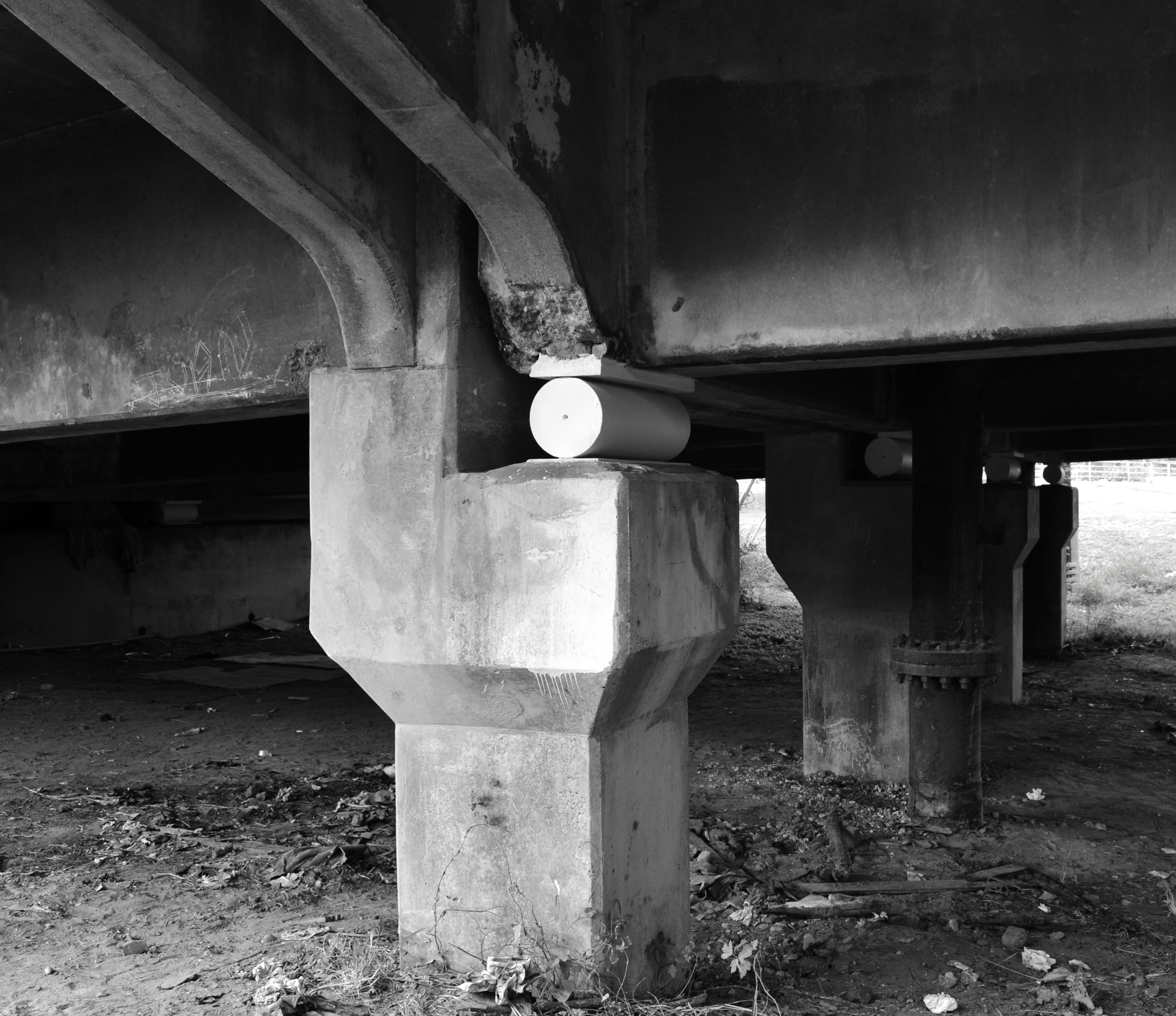
Roller supports under a bridge

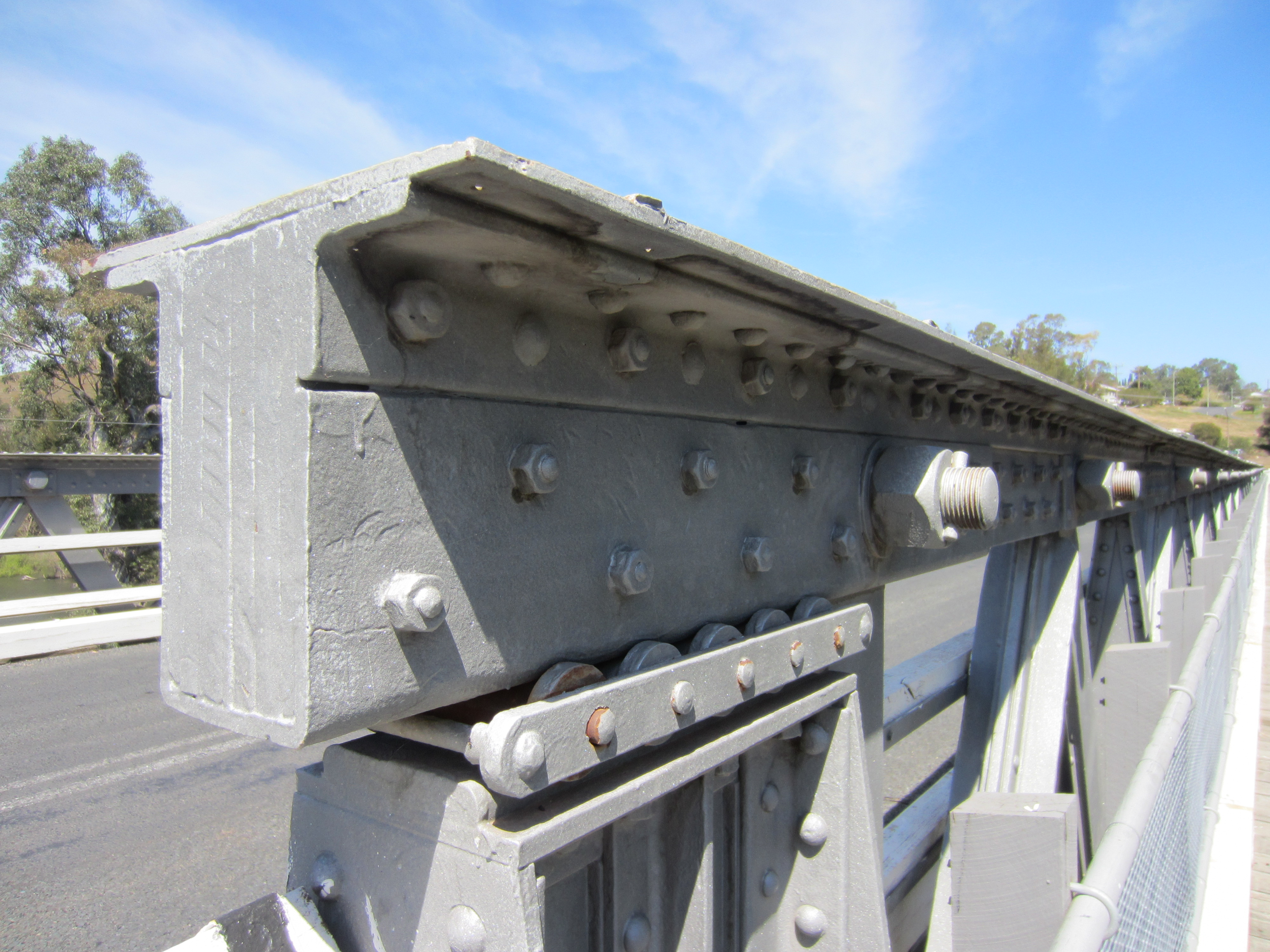
Rollers carrying the top chord of a bridge

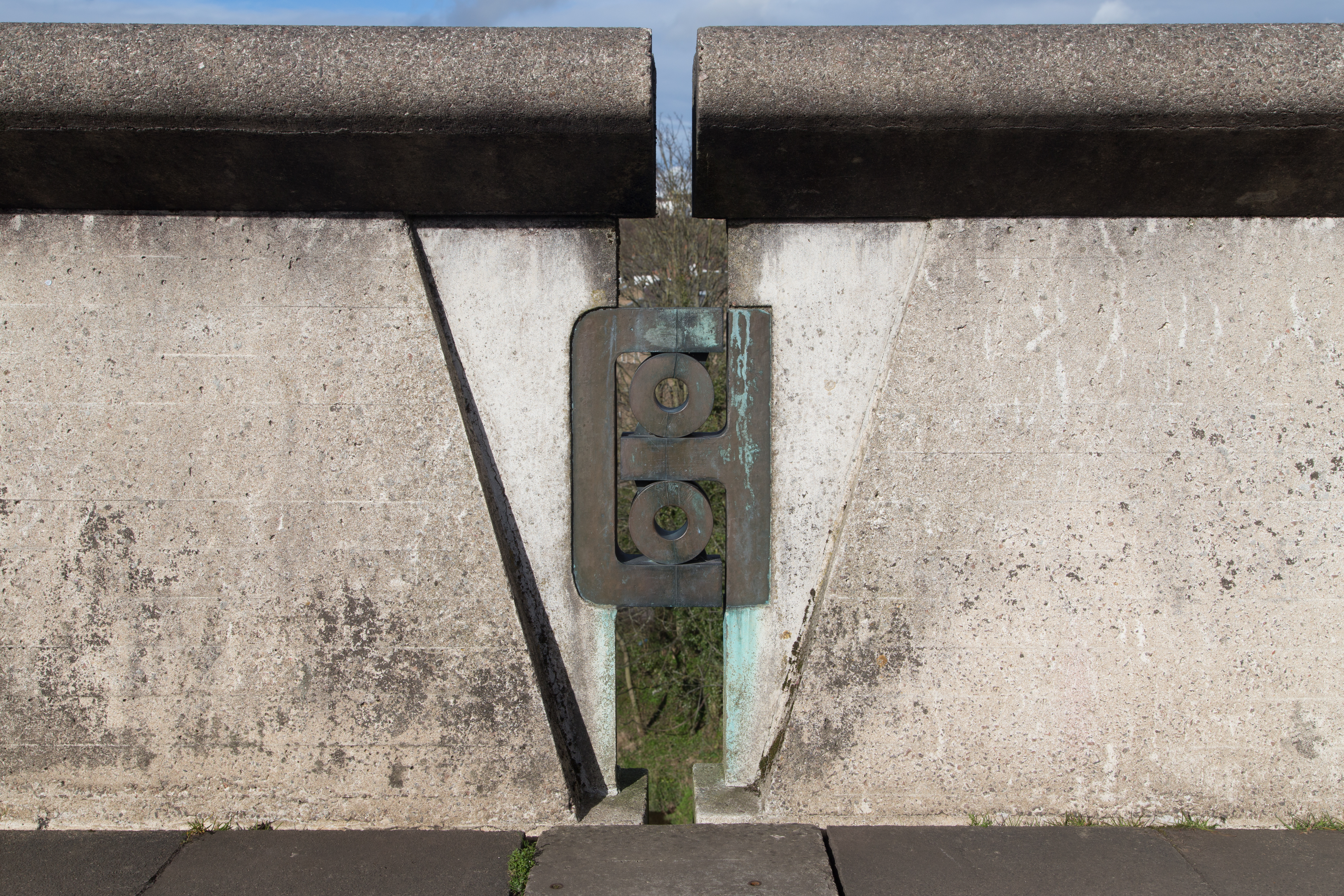
Expansion joint on a bridge

=== Pinned support ===
A pinned support or hinge support attaches the only web of a beam to a girder called a shear connection. The support can exert a force on a member acting in any direction and prevent translational movements, or relative displacement of the member-ends in all directions but cannot prevent any rotational movements. Its reaction forces are single linear forces of unknown direction or horizontal and vertical forces which are components of the single force of unknown direction.

A pinned support is just like a human elbow. It can be extended and flexed (rotation), but you cannot move your forearm left to right (translation). One benefit of pinned supports is not having internal moment forces and only their axial force playing a big role in designing them. However, a single pinned support cannot completely restrain a structure. At least two supports are needed to resist the moment. Applying in trusses is one frequent way we can use this support.

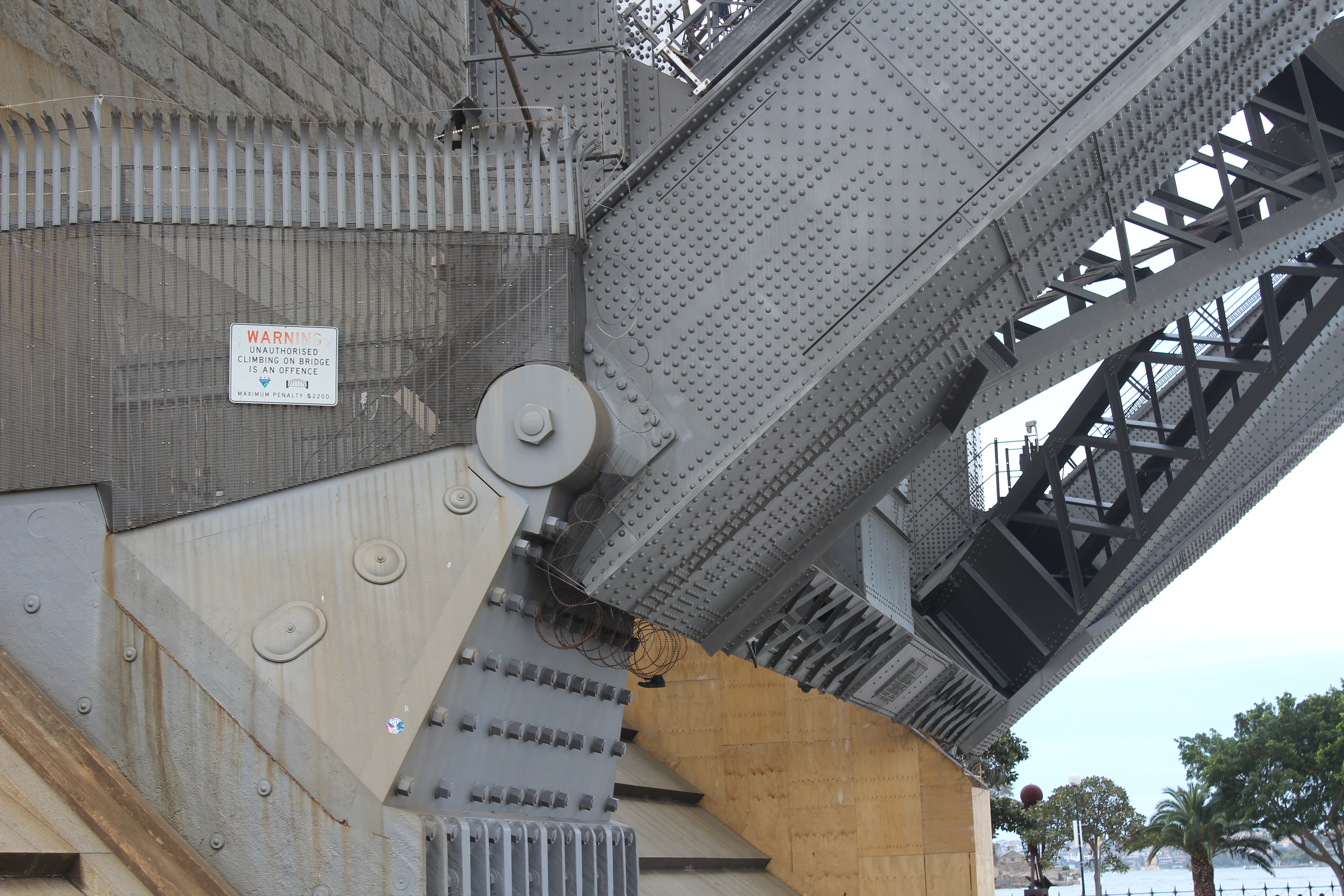
Hinge on a bridge

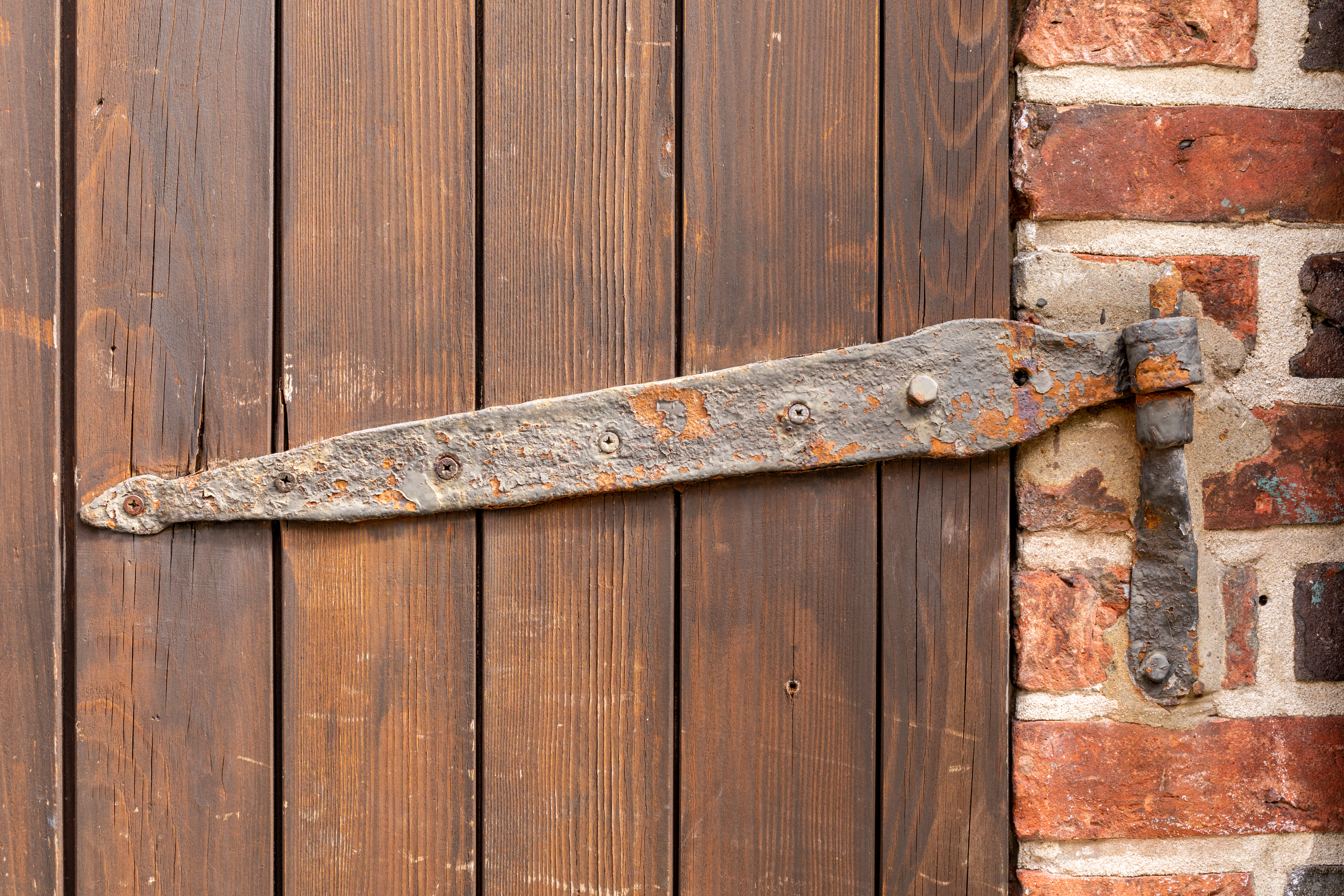
Hinge on a door

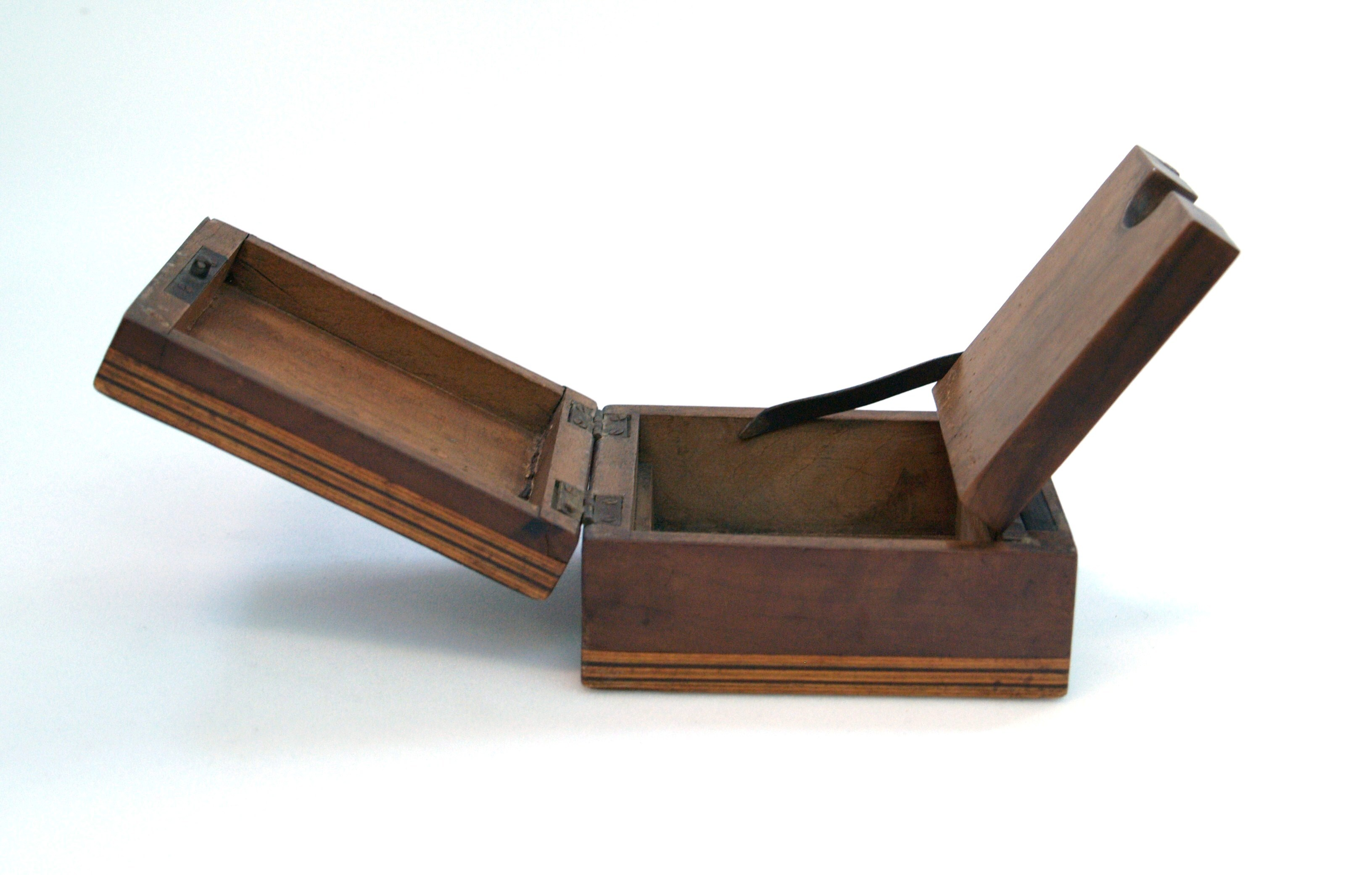
Hinge on a box

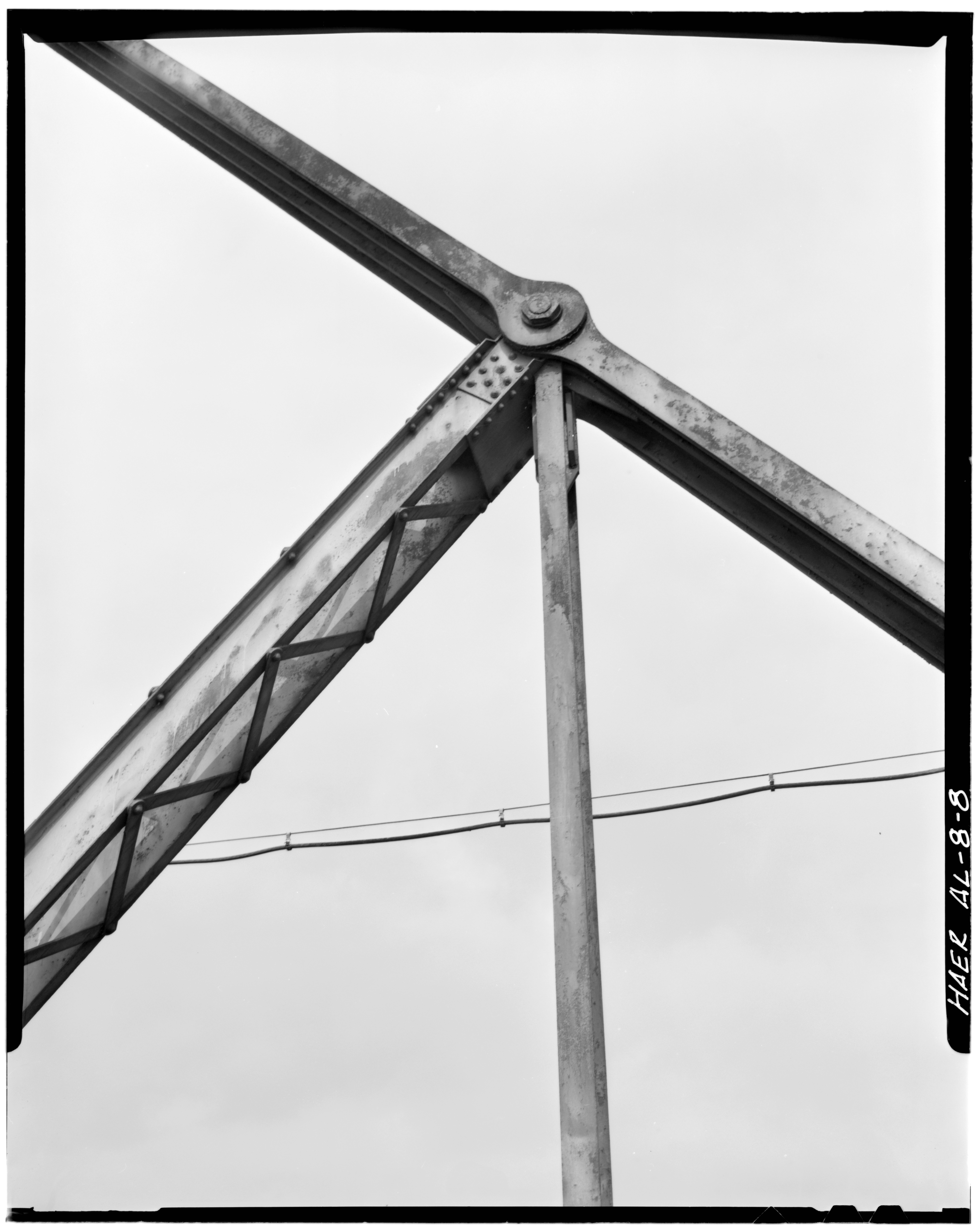

=== Fixed support ===
Rigid or fixed supports maintain the angular relationship between the joined elements and provide both force and moment resistance. It exerts forces acting in any direction and prevents all translational movements (horizontal and vertical) as well as all rotational movements of a member. These supports’ reaction forces are horizontal and vertical components of a linear resultant; a moment. It is a rigid type of support or connection. The application of the fixed support is beneficial when we can only use single support, and people most widely used this type as the only support for a cantilever. They are common in beam-to-column connections of moment-resisting steel frames and beam, column and slab connections in concrete frames.

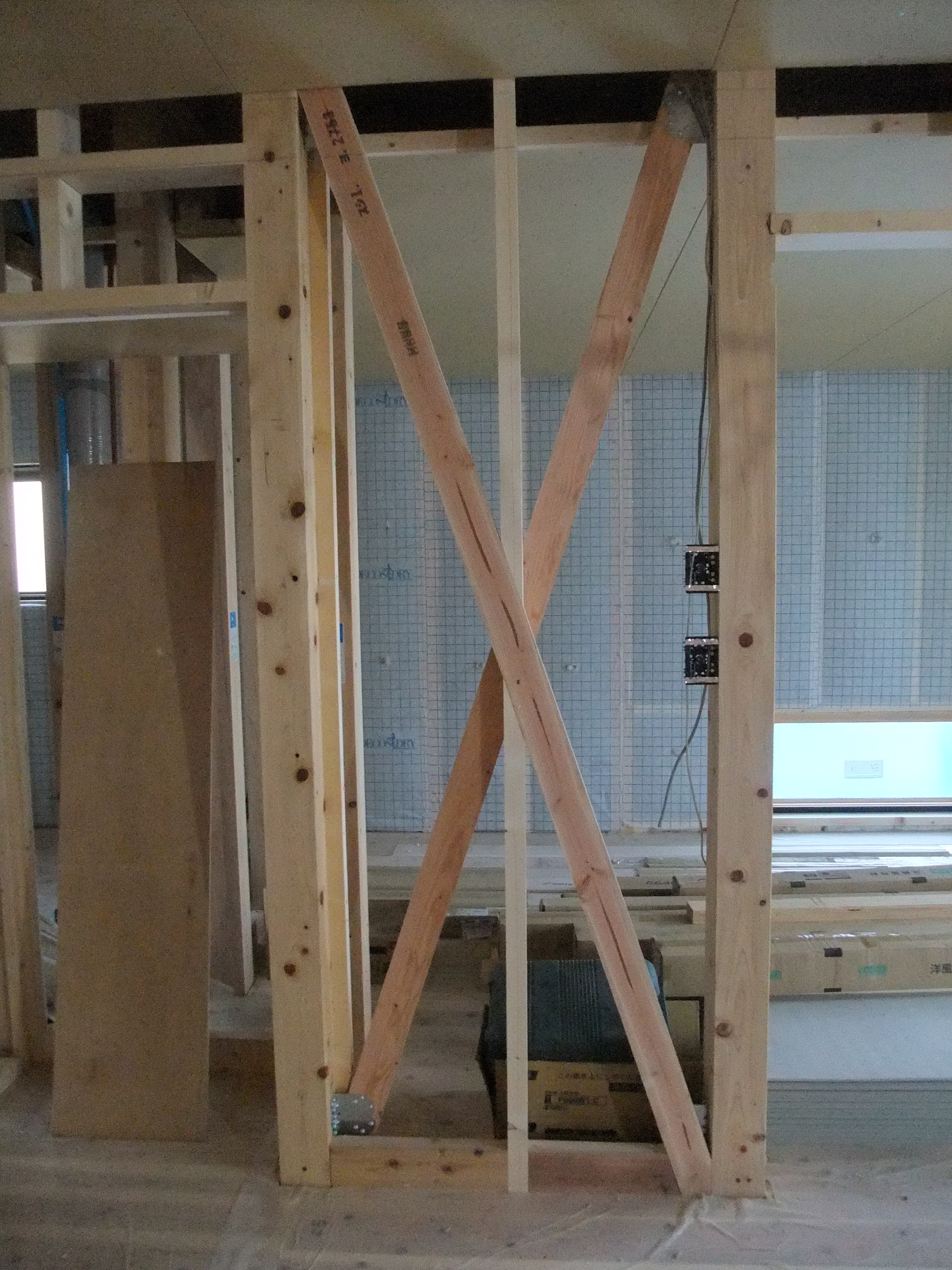
Cross bracing

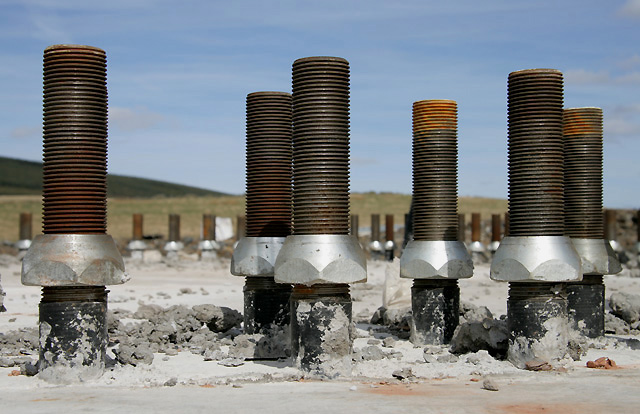
Column base attachment point

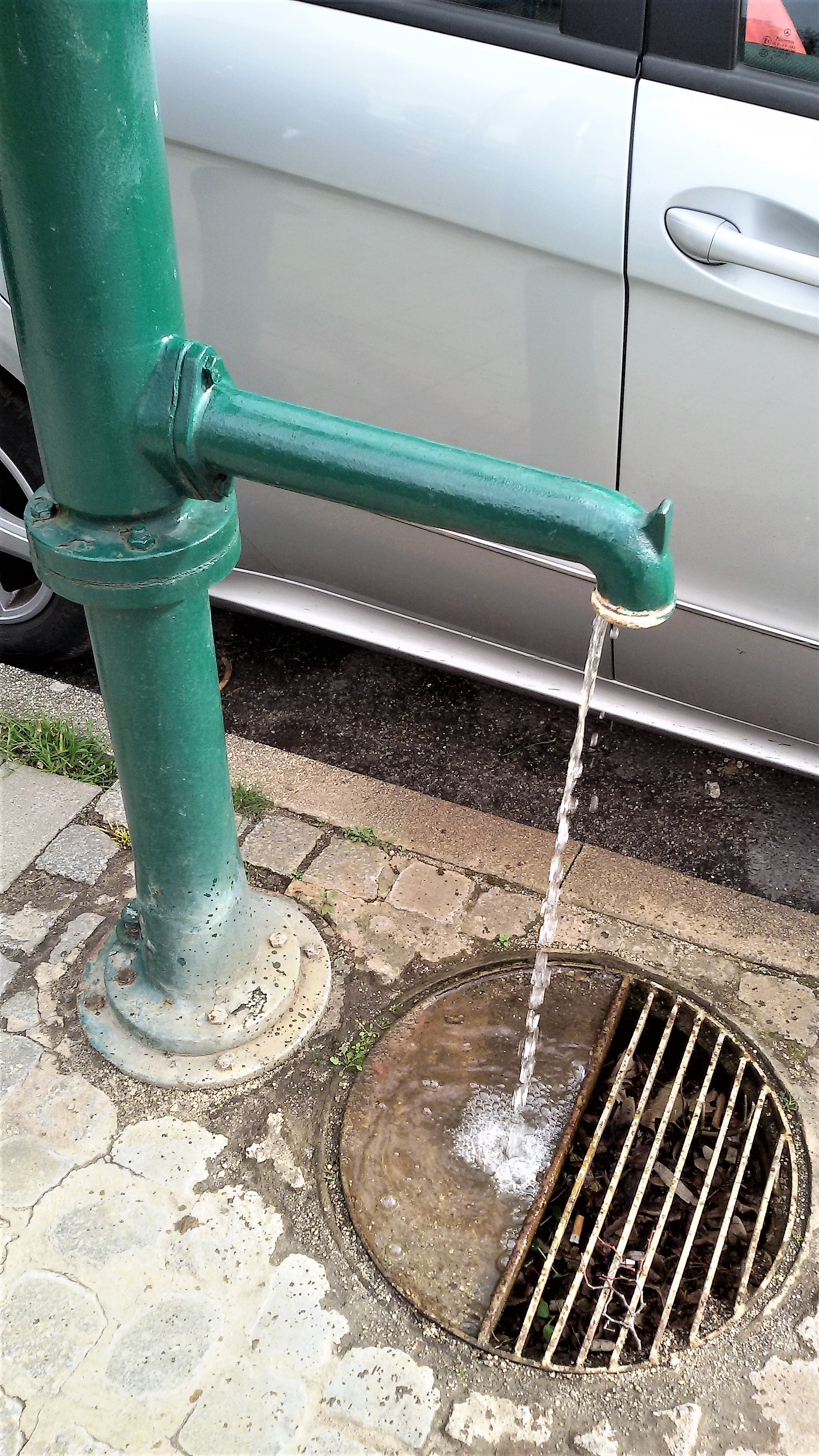

=== Hanger support ===
A hanger support only exerts a force and prevents a member from acting or translating away in the direction of the hanger. However, this support cannot prevent translational movement in all directions and any rotational movement. This is one of the simplest structural forms in which the elements are in pure tension. Structures of this type range from simple guyed or stayed structures to large cable-supported bridges and roof systems.

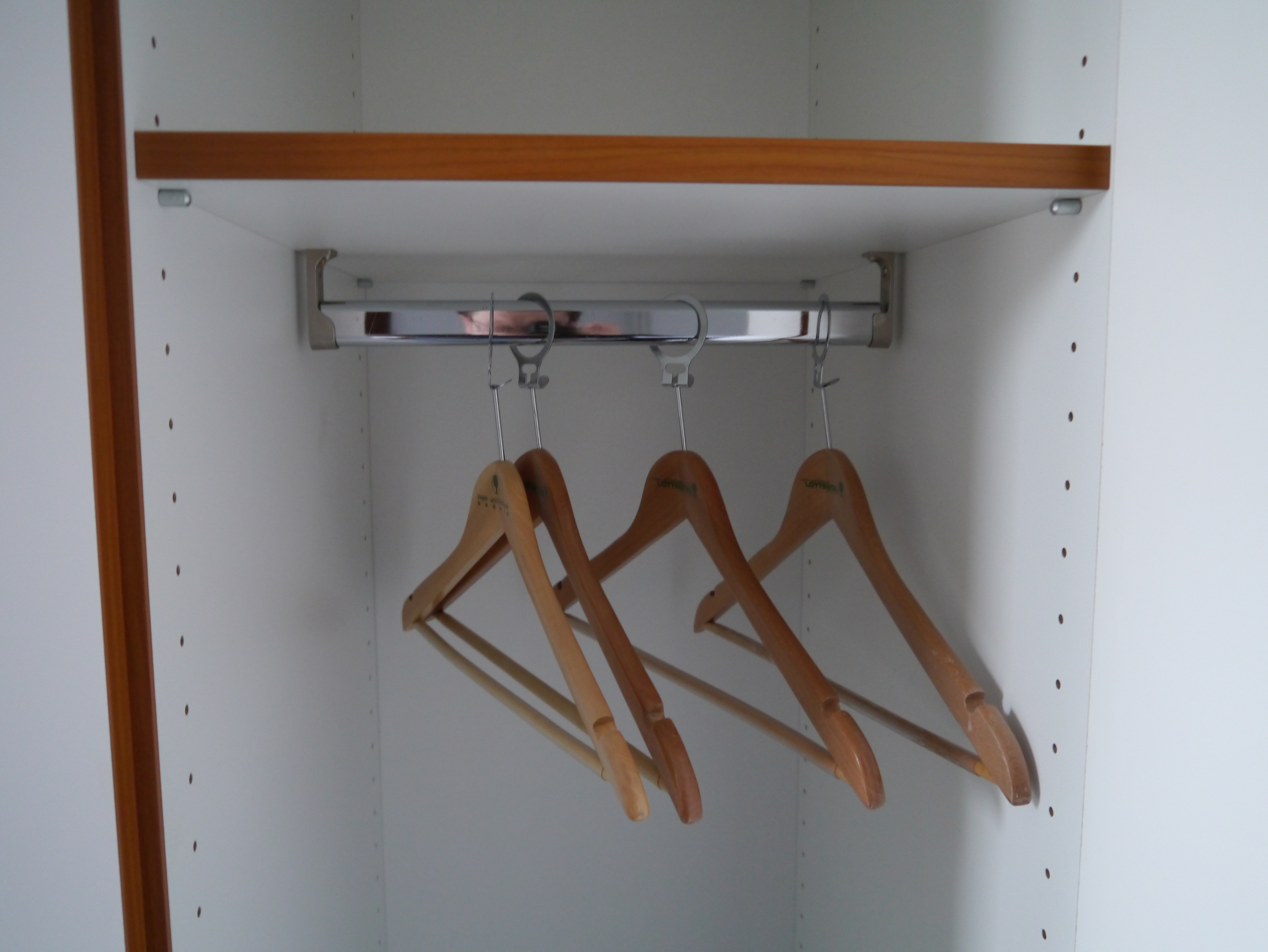

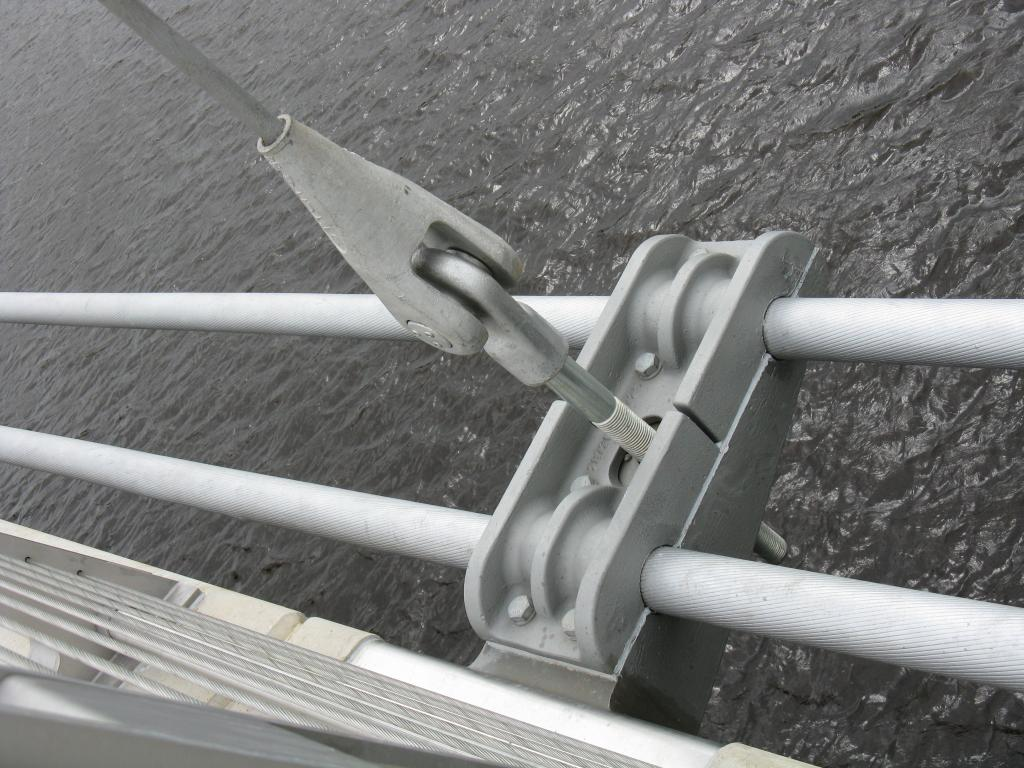

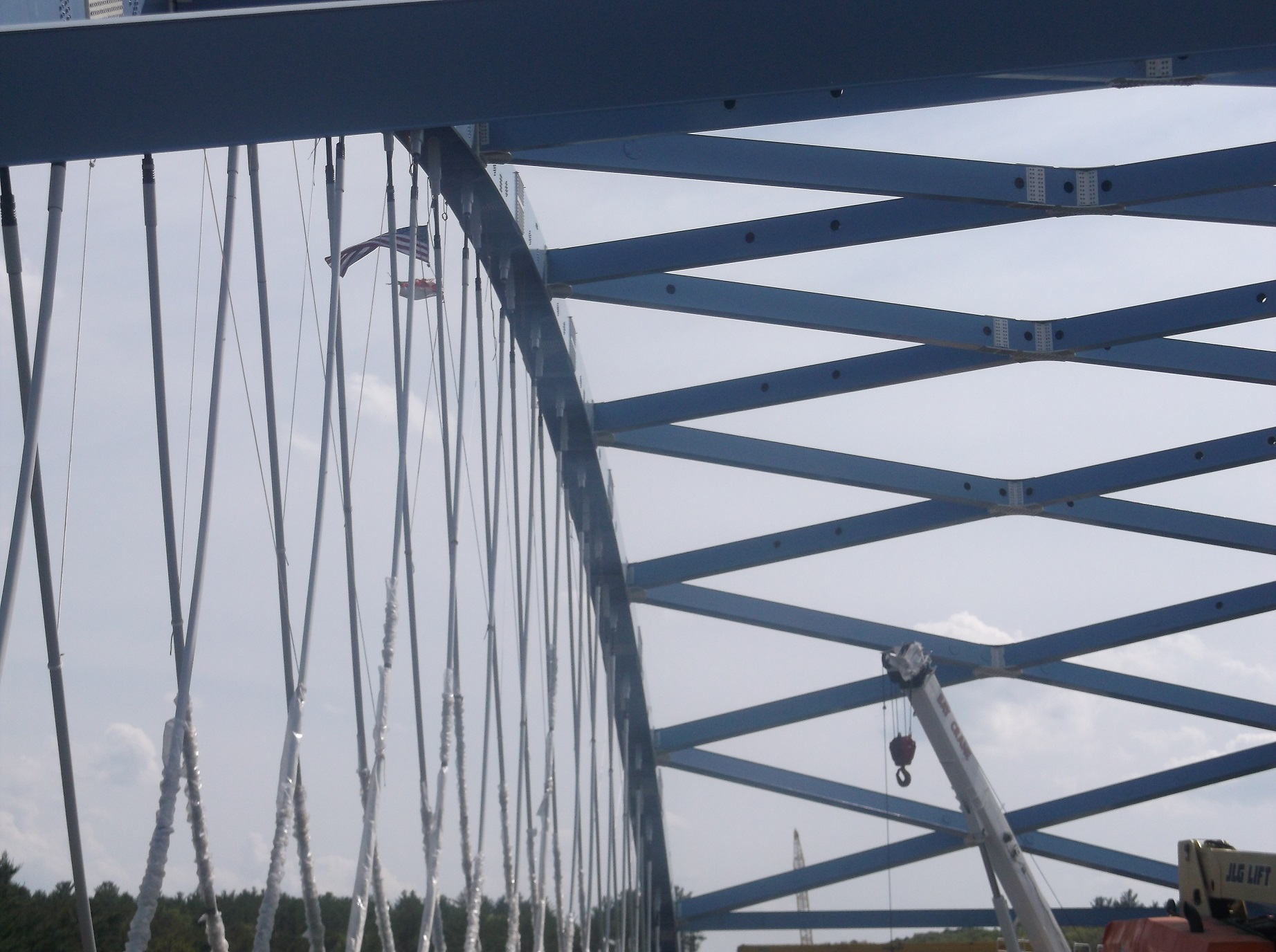

=== Simple support ===
A simple support is basically where the structural member rests on an external structure as in two concrete blocks holding a resting plank of wood on their tops. This support is similar to roller support in a sense that restrains vertical forces but not horizontal forces. Therefore, it is not widely used in real life structures unless the engineer can be sure that the member will not translate.

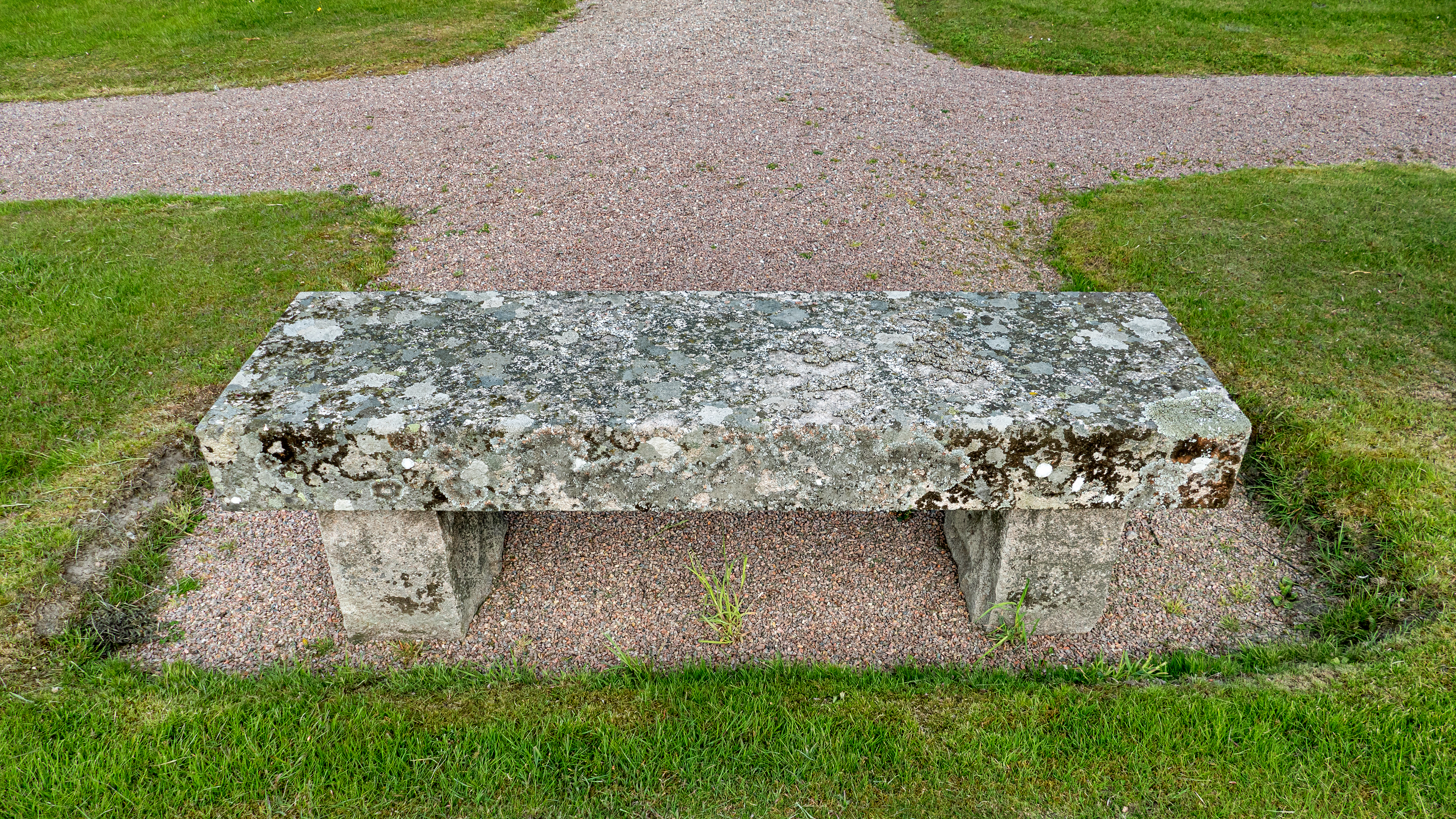
Simple support of a stone bench

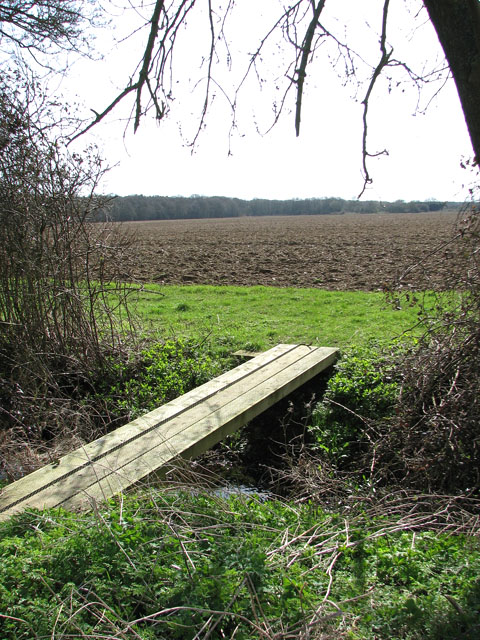
Simple bridge over a ditch

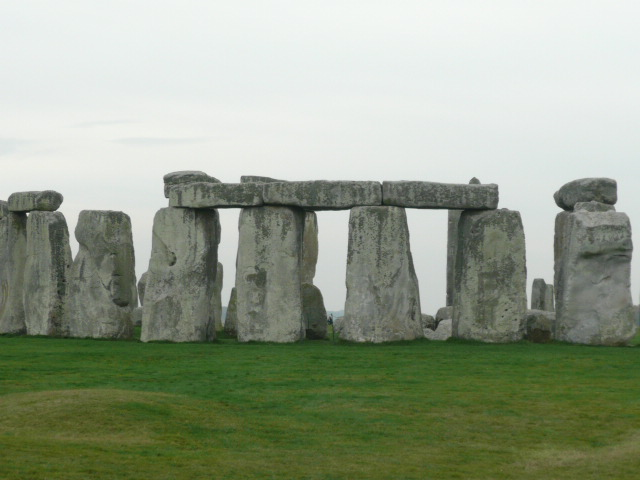
Stonehenge

=== Varieties of support ===
Varieties of support
Name	Schematic diagram	Simple figure	Allowed movement			Reaction	
Name	Schematic diagram	Simple figure	Vertical	Horizontal	Rotation (Moment)	Direction	Number
Roller or simple (movable) support			No	Yes	Yes		1
Pinned or hinged support			No	No	Yes		2
Middle hinge (for axial member)			No	No	Yes		2
Fixed support			No	No	No		3
Middle hinge (for beam member)			No	Yes	No		2

== See also ==
- Bracket (architecture), structural or decorative element that projects from a surface, usually to carry weight or strengthen an angle
- Joining technology, methods of assembly of engineering structures by mechanical joint of two or more elements
