= Bonded seal =

Type of washer used to create a seal around a screw or bolt

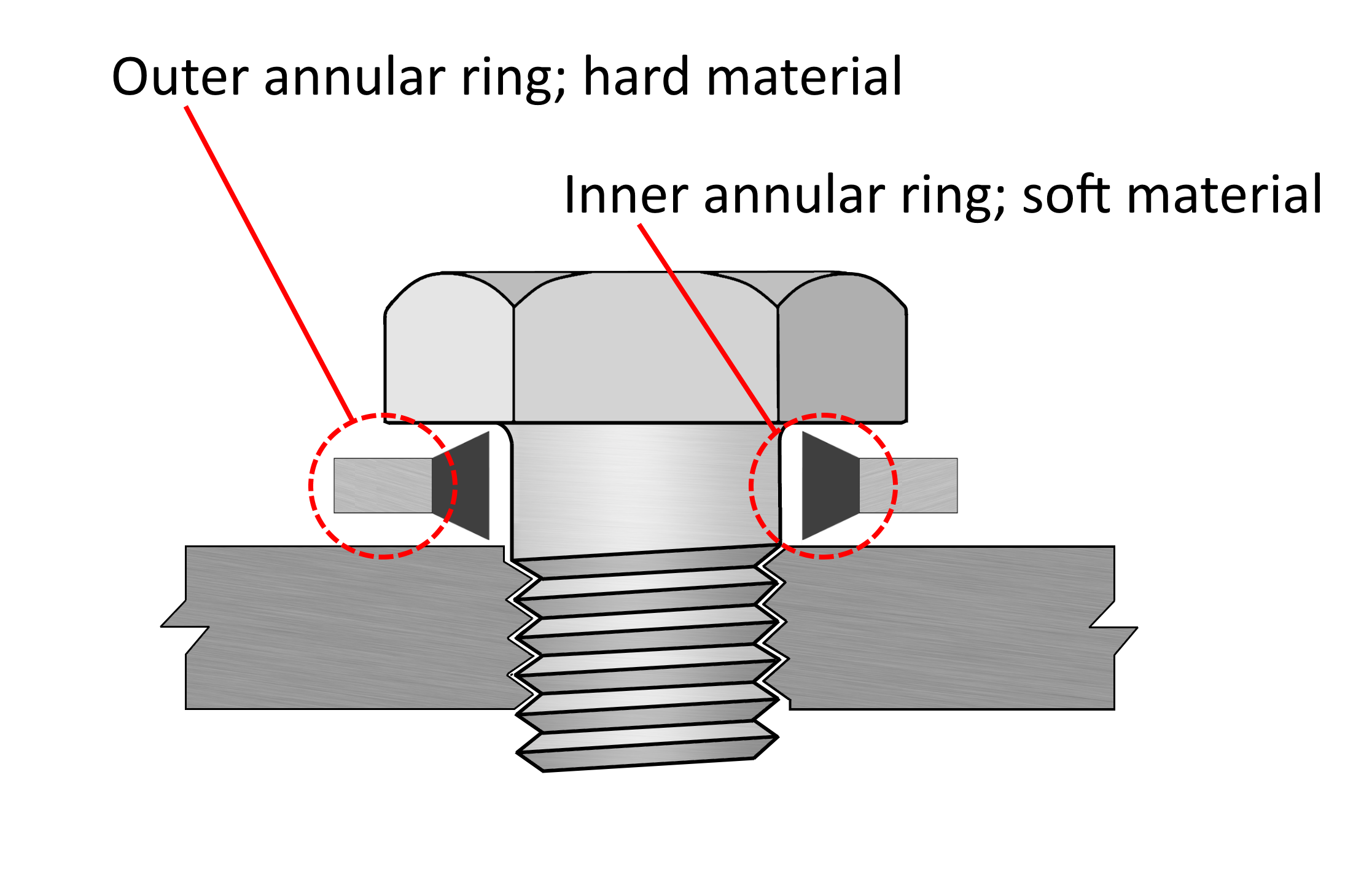
A bonded seal commonly seals between bolt head and body.

In mechanical engineering, a bonded seal is a type of washer used to provide a seal around a screw or bolt. Originally made by Dowty Group, they are also known as Dowty seals or Dowty washers. Now widely manufactured, they are available in a range of standard sizes and materials

A bonded seal consists of an outer annular ring of a hard material, typically steel, and an inner annular ring of an elastomeric material that acts as a gasket. It is the compression of the elastomeric part between the faces of the parts on either side of the bonded seal that provides the sealing action. The elastomeric material, typically nitrile rubber, is bonded by heat and pressure to the outer ring, which holds it in place. This structure increases resistance to bursting, increasing the pressure rating of the seal. Because the bonded seal itself acts to retain the gasket material, there is no need for the parts to be sealed to be shaped to retain the gasket. This results in simplified machining and greater ease of use as compared to some other seals, such as O-rings. Some designs come with an additional flap of rubber on the internal diameter to locate the bonded seal at the centre of the hole; these are called self-centring bonded washers.
