= Hydrodynamic seal =

Type of mechanical seal

A hydrodynamic seal (also sometimes called a dynamic‑groove mechanical face seal) is a type of mechanical seal in which one of the sealing faces (typically the rotating ring) incorporates grooves that act as miniature pumps, generating a hydrodynamic (or gas/hydro‐film) pressure in the gap between the faces. During rotation the grooved rotor draws fluid (liquid or gas) into the groove structure and builds a fluid film between the rotor and the opposing (stationary) face. That film supports the load, separates the faces, and reduces wear.

Such seals contrast with purely hydrostatic or contacting face seals: because the grooves generate the film actively, hydrodynamic seals typically offer greater film stiffness, lower leakage, and lower lift‑off (or spin‑up) speeds compared to many hydrostatic designs.

Hydrodynamic seals find applications across many industries pumps, compressors, turbines, new‑energy electric vehicle drives, gas seals, and more.

== Groove Design and Their Role ==
The groove geometry plays a critical role in determining the performance of the hydrodynamic seal: leakage rate, film stiffness (rigidity), opening/lift‐off force, durability, contamination resistance, etc.

Research emphasizes that groove shape, helix angle, width/depth ratio, number of grooves, and other parameters significantly influence performance.

Grooves act by pumping fluid into the interface, building hydrodynamic pressure under the rotating face, and thereby supporting the load and reducing direct contact. For instance, one study compared a “diffuser groove” (a spiral‐type but with a converging geometry) vs. a flat cross‑section spiral groove, finding the diffuser groove achieved higher opening force for the same leakage.

Because groove design is so influential, many designs and optimizations have been proposed. Below are some of the more common groove types.

== Common Groove Types ==
Here are some of the typical groove topologies used in hydrodynamic seals, with a summary of their characteristics:

1. Spiral (Helical) Groove
2. Wave or Wavy Groove
3. V‑Grooves
4. U‑Grooves
5. Double V or Multi‐V Grooves

== Applications ==
Hydrodynamic seals are used in a variety of demanding applications where reliability, high speed, low leakage, and non‐contact operation are desirable. Examples:

- Gas turbine auxiliary power units (APUs) and other aerospace rotating machinery.
- Pumps, compressors handling liquids or gases at high speed/pressure: axial, radial, dry‐gas seals.
- New‑energy electric vehicle drives: a recent study on micro‑grooved pumping seals (oil–air biphasic) examines 17 groove types and finds an “inverted fir tree” micro‐groove optimal under certain conditions.
- Process industry mechanical seals in petrochemical, nuclear, etc, where a self‐pumping hydrodynamic mechanical seal without flushing systems is beneficial.

== See also ==
- Dry gas seal
- Tribology
- Lubrication
- Fluid dynamics
- Rotordynamics
