= Compression seal fitting =

Type of mechanical seal

In mechanical engineering, a compression seal fitting, also known as a sealing gland, is intended to seal some type of element (probe, wire, conductor, pipe, tube, fiber-optic cable, etc.) when the element must pass through a pressure or environmental boundary. A compression seal fitting may serve several purposes:

- It restrains the element from moving as a result of a pressure difference.
- It prohibits the leakage of gas or liquid media along the element.
- In some cases, it electrically isolates the element from the mounting device.

A compression seal fitting, unlike an epoxy seal or gasket, uses mechanical components and an axial force to compress a soft sealant inside a body which then creates a seal. An epoxy seal differs in that it is composed of some type of compound which is poured into a mold in an attempt to create a seal.

== Applications ==
Typical applications include pressure vessels, autoclaves, holding tanks, pipelines, furnaces, or anywhere wires or sensors need to pass from inside to outside a vessel or wall where the pressure differentials or hazardous environments cause concern.

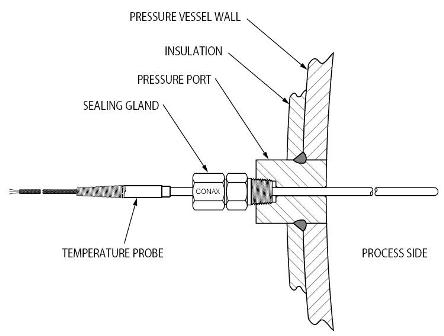

== Components ==
A very basic compression seal fitting is composed of four mechanical parts:

- The body, which holds the elements being sealed and enables the other components to compress into it.
- The cap, which secures the sealant and follower into the body. Most importantly, when it is torqued into the body, it pushes the follower into the sealant which creates the axial force and creates the seal.
- The follower, which is pushed into the sealant from the torque on the cap and compresses the sealant. The sealant then fills all void spaces around the element and between the body.
- The soft sealant (a solid rubber-like component, not a liquid or paste), which surrounds the elements being sealed, and when compressed by axial force creates a hermetic seal. The continuous tension in the torqued body acts like a spring to maintain compression on the sealant and maintain a positive seal. Some soft sealants include Neoprene, Viton, Teflon tape), Lava sealant (magnesium aluminum silicate), and Grafoil (graphite foil). The appropriate sealant for a gland depends on the environment being sealed against.

A single compression seal fitting may seal on a single or multiple elements. Sealing glands designed to seal on single elements consist of a body, cap, sealant and follower. When sealing on multiple elements, gland designs also include a seat and an anti-rotation pin to prevent wires or conductors from twisting and shearing. One or more insulators may also be included when electrical isolation is required.

== History and development ==
Soft sealant technology for compression seal fittings was developed in the 1950s by Conax Technologies. Since then, compression seal fittings have evolved to include multiple variations for different applications. Some applications include:

=== Single-element sealing ===
Single-element compression seal fittings are used to seal a single element such as a temperature probe, tubewell, pipe, etc.

- Packing Gland (PG) Series - for sealing on anything from fragile tubes and soft cables to solid probes or instruments
- Midlock (MK) Series - Best used for sealing on metal elements and/or high vibration environments
- Electrode (EG) Series - Fully isolating for electrical power or instrument isolation to 8000 V. Teflon insulation and sealant material used for high performance and chemical resistance.
- Split (PGS) Series - seals cables and leads when larger probes or connectors are attached.

=== Multiple-element sealing ===
Multiple-element compression seal fittings are used when multiple elements of the same or different diameters such as metal tubing, ceramic or rigid plastic tube or pipe, temperature probe, a tubewell, low voltage instrumentation wire, or a power supply feedthrough.

- Transducer (TG) Series - For bare wire sealing where elements remain fully electrically isolated throughout the fitting
- Multi-hole Ceramic (MHC) Series - Non-isolating fitting for multiple elements up to 0.125 in (3.175 mm) diameter
- Multi-hole Metal (MHM) Series - A flexible design for special hole patterns, irregular shapes, and mixtures of element sizes
- Split (PGS/SPG/DSPG) Series - For sealing elements that can pass through gland body but not the internal components
- Sensor Wire Seal (BSWS) Series - For sealing sensor leads in low-temperature and pressure applications. Ideal for embedded bearing temperature sensors, vibrations sensors, and proximity probes.

== See also ==
- Seal (mechanical)
- Stuffing box
