= Hydrostatic seal =

Mechanical seal

A hydrostatic seal is a non-contacting mechanical seal that operates under an equilibrium of forces. Unlike traditional hydrodynamic seals, hydrostatic seals have two different pressure zones that are used to establish a balanced pressure zone between two seal faces. The two-pressure system makes the seal unique because typical mechanical seals have one pressure zone that causes a buildup of pressure that will eventually cause the seal to malfunction. After pressure has come to an equilibrium at the seal face, an incompressible fluid is then released between the two seal faces. The fluid creates a film around the seal face that acts as a lubricant and as a medium for the substance flowing through the seal. Hydrostatic seals have been used in the aircraft industry; however they have seen very little commercial use because there is minimal research about the seals.

== Pressure and Operation ==
Once pressure is applied and the seal comes together, a viscous liquid is released between the two seal faces and a thin film is formed to help create an airtight seal. If the amount of pressure inside of the seal is increased and there is an excess of pressure between the face plates, the two faces move apart and the seal begins to open. On the contrary, if the pressure is dropped and there is not enough pressure within the seal, the two seal faces come together and the hydrostatic seal begins to form. The flow rate of the system can also be controlled with great accuracy by limiting the amount of pressure within the seal. Pressure zones can be changed to create an equilibrium within the system that would allow less leakage in the overall system.

== Seal Face ==
The seals dual pressure zone helps maintain a constant pressure zone within the system. The constant pressure stabilizes the seal and does not allow the two seal faces to come in contact. There are face control grooves on both of seal faces that stabilize each face in the axial direction. The slightest axial movement will cause the two seal faces to touch and erosion of the seal will begin to occur.

The rear face plate consists of a small opening that houses the injection system, which feeds the incompressible fluids through the system. Once the fluid is inside the seal, it forms a thin film around the entire inner system. After creating the film, the fluids then flow out of the seal and on to the rear face plate, which cools the system and prevents any excess heat from building up. This fluid cycle is continuously repeated while the seal is in operation.

== Applications ==
Hydrostatic seals were first developed in the early 1960s to control the sealing of compressor air in the aircraft industry. Recently hydrostatic seals have only been used in the compressor industry because hydrodynamic seals have much greater application. The hydrostatic seal also has great potential in the chemical industry since it can be used to transport and seal chemicals. However, the chemical industry has set very strict regulations and the seal cannot be used for certain chemicals because of the constant seal leakage.

== Generations of hydrostatic seals ==
=== First generation ===
The first hydrostatic seal was developed to replace current hydrodynamic seals; previous hydrodynamic seals were costly to manufacture and were tedious to assemble. First generation hydrostatic seals used a two pressure system to establish equilibrium at the seal face. The seal face was developed to work under high pressure conditions, however the seal face began to warp and deteriorate during stress tests. Once ammonia ( the liquid used in the first hydrostatic seal ) was added, the two seal faces would make contact with each other and begin the erosion process. Cold water was then tested as the incompressible fluid, it has double the viscosity as ammonia, which showed favorable results. Since cold water had double the viscosity of ammonia, the water prevented the seals from making contact with each other, thus causing the system to run properly.

==== First Generation: Issues ====
- High pressure conditions

- recycles fluid in a continuous cycle, may have stagnant fluids which cause blockage

- Seal faces began to erode under certain circumstances

=== Second Generation ===
The second hydrostatic seal was an attempt to resolve first generation hydrostatic seal problems: erosion of seals, high pressure build up, and stagnant fluids. Second generation hydrostatic seals had a redesigned seal face; new face control grooves were added to help stabilize the seals while under extreme conditions. Prior to the face control grooves, the seal faces were not balanced and would begin to move under high pressure conditions. Due to the movement, the seal faces would become misaligned when the seals moved, and that caused the seal faces to deteriorate, resulting in an unusable seal.

==== Second generation: Upgrades ====
- attempt to fix warping caused by system error

- added face control grooves to prevent any erosion of seal faces

- resolved any areas where fluid remains stagnant and cause blockage

== Arising Problems ==
Hydrostatic seals should last multiple years without any deterioration to its components due to its overall structure. There should not be any contact between the two seal faces or else the condition of the seal will begin to deteriorate. Current Hydrodynamic seals begin to deteriorate over time because the two faces are always in contact with each other.

In addition, any misalignment of the seal faces will cause them to rub which will begin to morph the seal faces and eventually cause the entire seal to become structurally unstable. Izchak Etsion, a researcher at the Lewis Research Center, conducted an experiment to test what happens to a hydrostatic seal when its faces are misaligned. Etsion discovered that high pressures directed towards the outer face of the seal would cause static instability, while high pressure on the inner face of the seal would cause the seal to become more stable. In addition, axial misalignment would also cause the horizontal shaft to shift in the vertical direction; this misalignment would result in a faulty seal if the restoring force is not great enough to correct the shift in components.

=== Leakage ===
The structure of the seal brings up the problem of leakage within the system. Since there is always a minuscule gap between two parts, there is always the problem of leakage, however the system’s structure allows leakage to be controlled to a very precise level.

Another problem that arises about hydrostatic seals is that excess leakage may eventually lead to erosion of the seal’s structure. Due to the axially rotating face seal, any excess leakage will have a high fluid velocity which can erode away at the face plates, eventually leading to a faulty seal.
