= Joining technology =

Method of combining parts of equipment

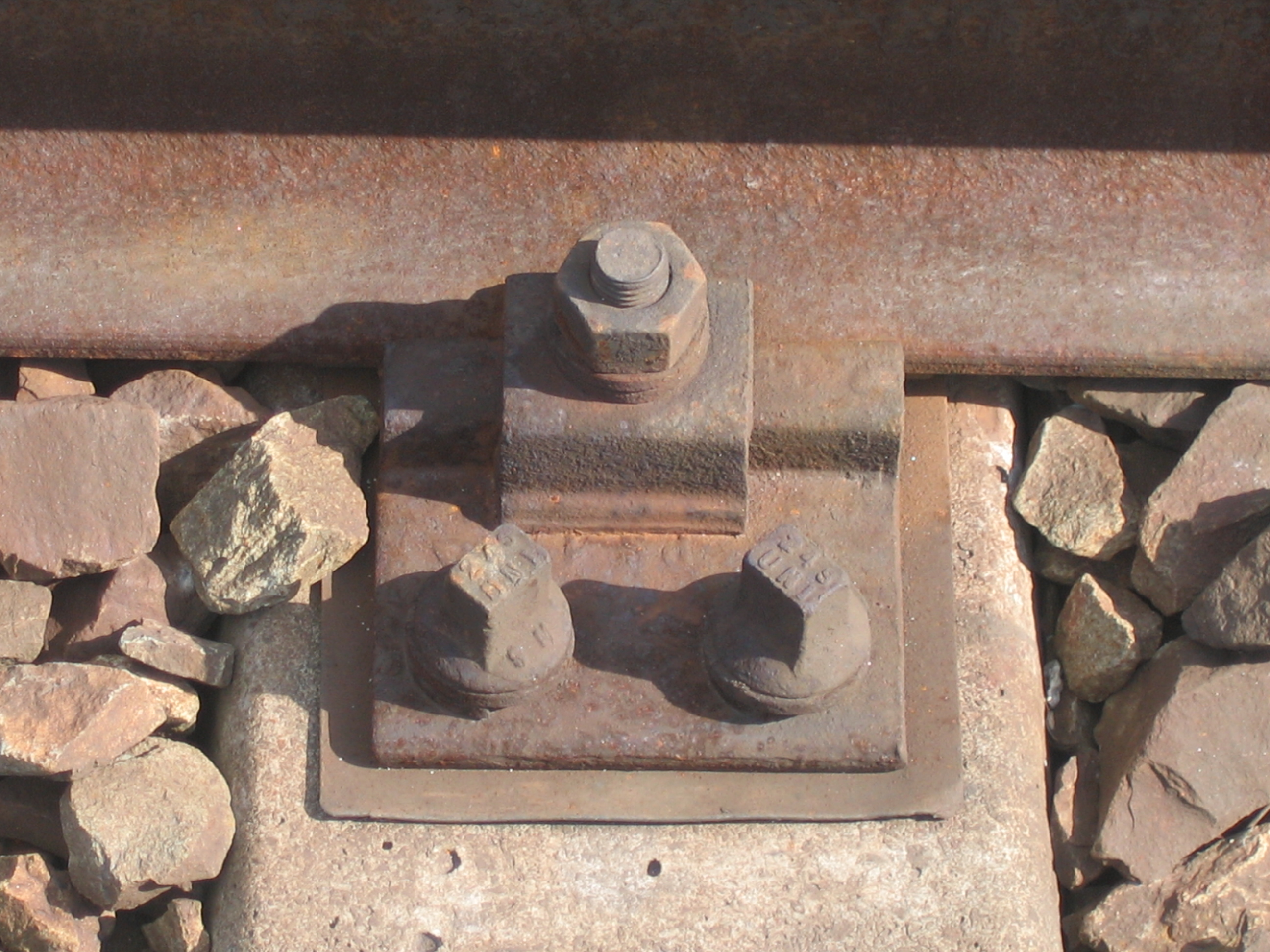
Connection between rail and sleeper

The joining technology is used in any type of mechanical joint which is the arrangement formed by two or more elements: typically, two physical parts and a joining element. The mechanical joining systems make possible to form a set of several pieces using the individual parts and the corresponding joining elements. There are fixed sets and removable sets.

Most common utensils (tools, furniture, weapons, clothing, footwear, vehicles, et cetera) are made up of sets of parts. The study of mechanical joints is essential to ensure the proper functioning of the mentioned assemblies.”.

== Types of unions ==
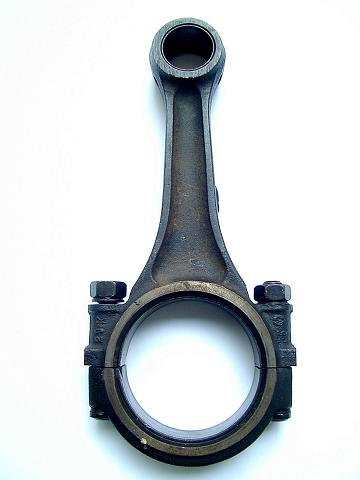
Connecting rod from a Volkswagen engine.

=== Metallic materials ===
- Riveted joint
- Bolted joint
- Pin joint
- Prismatic joint
- Folded joints: Sheet metal folding joint
- Spline, a way of connecting two pieces of metal so that they can slide lengthwise and yet be locked so that they rotate together
- Welded joints
  - Soldering
  - Brazing
  - Spot welding

=== Wood ===
The joints between pieces of wood (natural or processed), between materials similar to joint effects (for example, plastic foam boards) and combined materials can be various. If the parts to be joined include (in addition to wood) metals, ceramic materials or polymers, the joints can be more elaborate.

==== Joints ====
Joints of two pieces of wood . A mortise determines the shape of the ends of the two pieces of wood to be joined. Some of traditional joints are listed below:

- Dovetail joint
- Pocket-hole joinery
- Biscuit joint
- Dowel (carpentry)
- Tongue and groove
- Butt joint, for example traditional violins
- Beveled joint, for example two pieces of plywood

==== Joining elements ====
- Fastener
- Nails
  - Copper
  - Bronze, brass, aluminium and others
  - Iron
- Screws
  - Self-tapping screw
  - Bolt (fastener)
- Staples
- Threaded inserts
- Glues and adhesives
  - Brickwork
- Female and male (forced assembly)

==== Tools with wooden handle ====
Often the handle of traditional tools are wedged and forced. Sometimes with a skinny type bailer or similar.

- Hammers
- Axes
- Scythe
- Chisel
- Plane
- Adzes

== Others ==
- Barrels (metal staves and hoops)

=== Polymers ===
- Glues and adhesives
- Plastic welding

=== Flexible materials ===
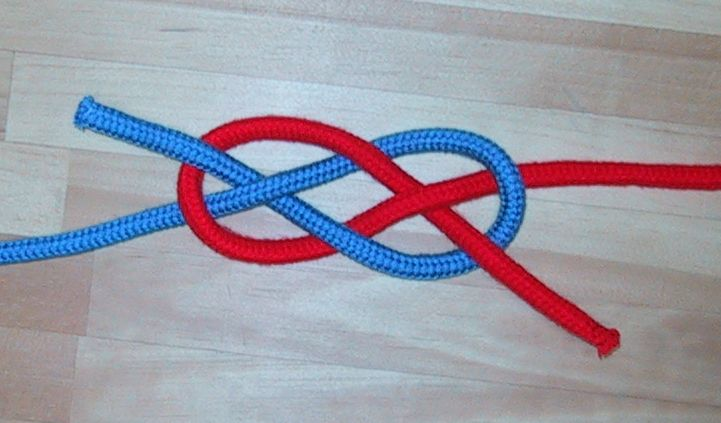
Knots

- Knots
- Sewn boats
- Ropes

=== Self unions ===
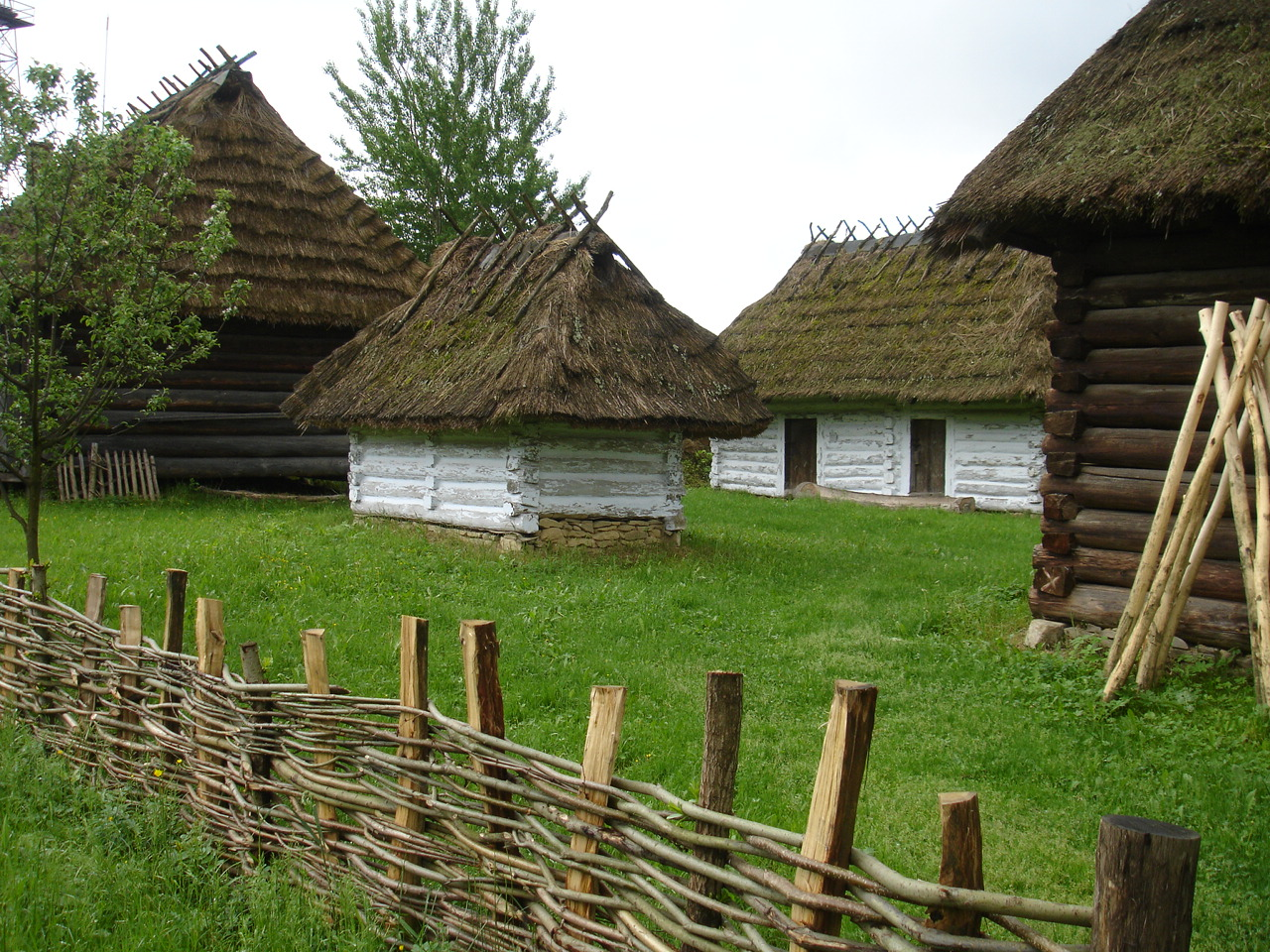
Wooden fence

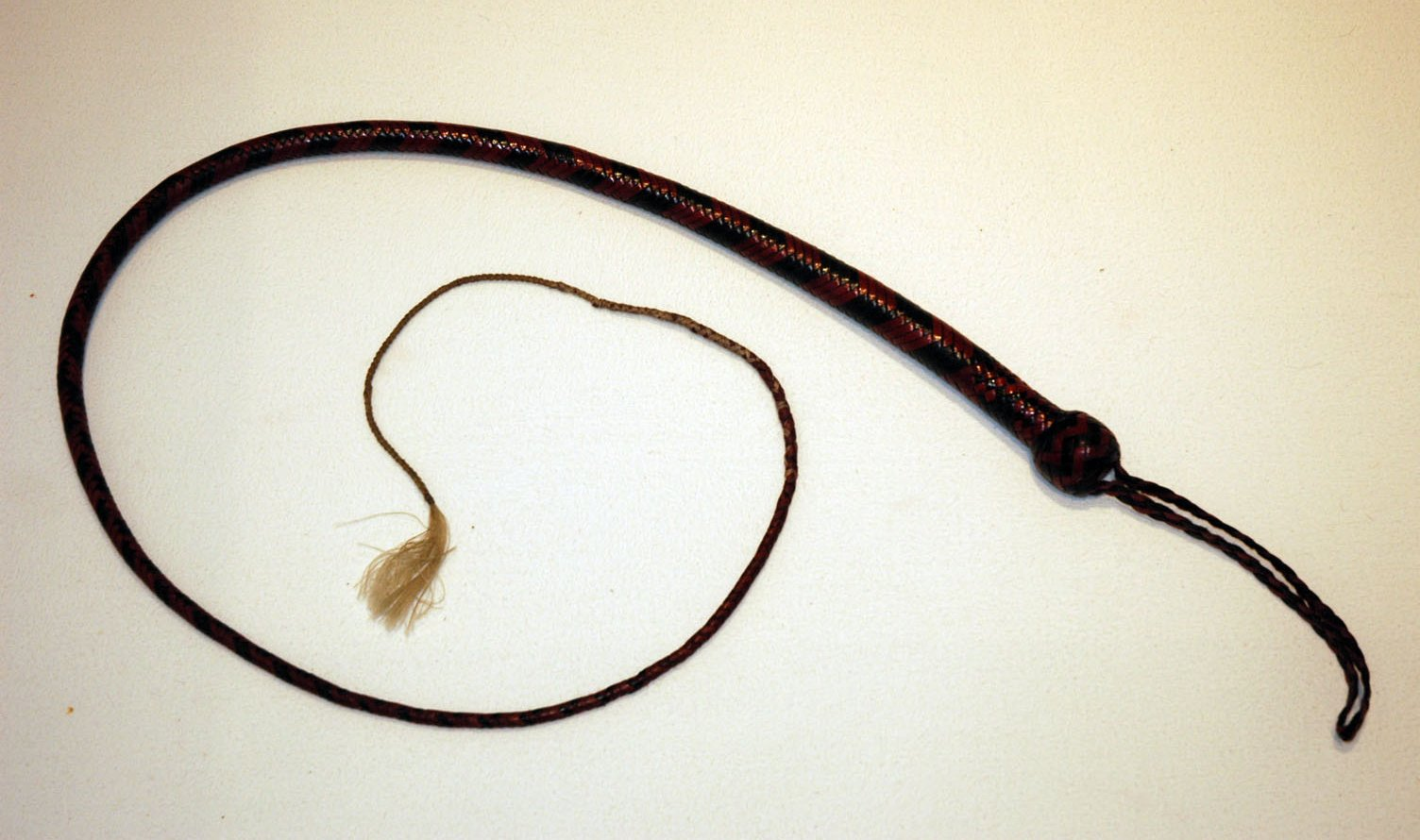
Braided pigtail

Some manufactured items are made from a raw material using self unions, that is: unions without using other joining materials.

- Basketry
- Reed mats
- Fabric
- Felt
- Knitted fabrics
- Braided leather
  - For example: in a braided leather whip, all joints are made without any kind of sewing thread or adhesive
- Fishing nets
- Metallic nets
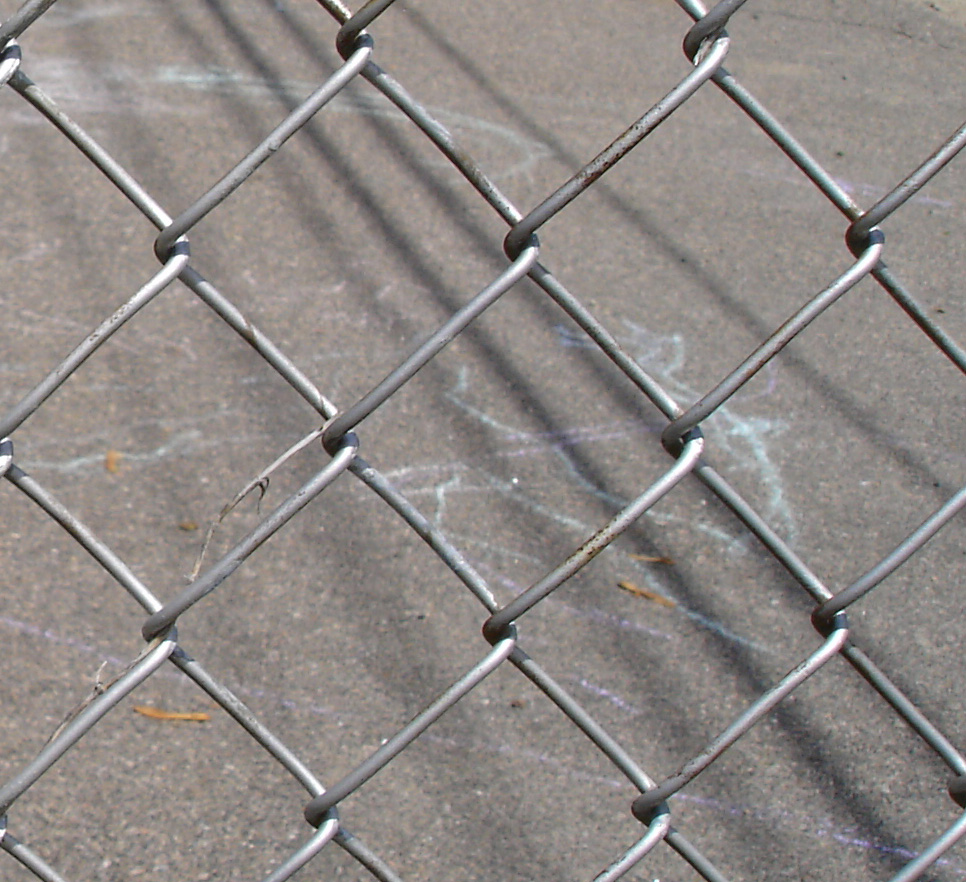
Chain-link fencing

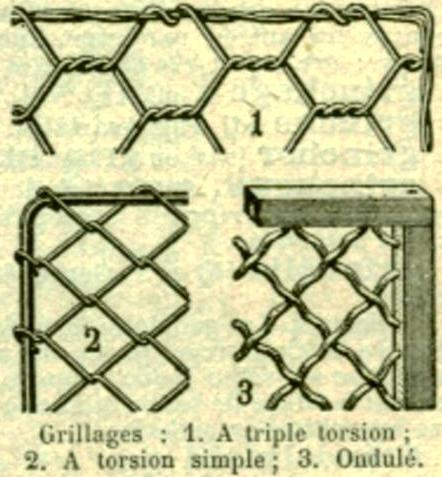
The different types of net: 1 triple fold, 2 single fold, 3 corrugated (Claude Augé:Larousse universel, 1922)

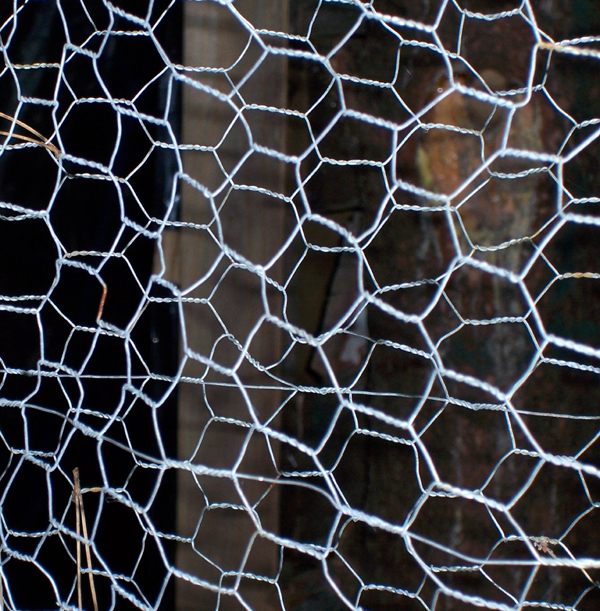
"Hexagonal metal cages for poultry

== Historical examples ==
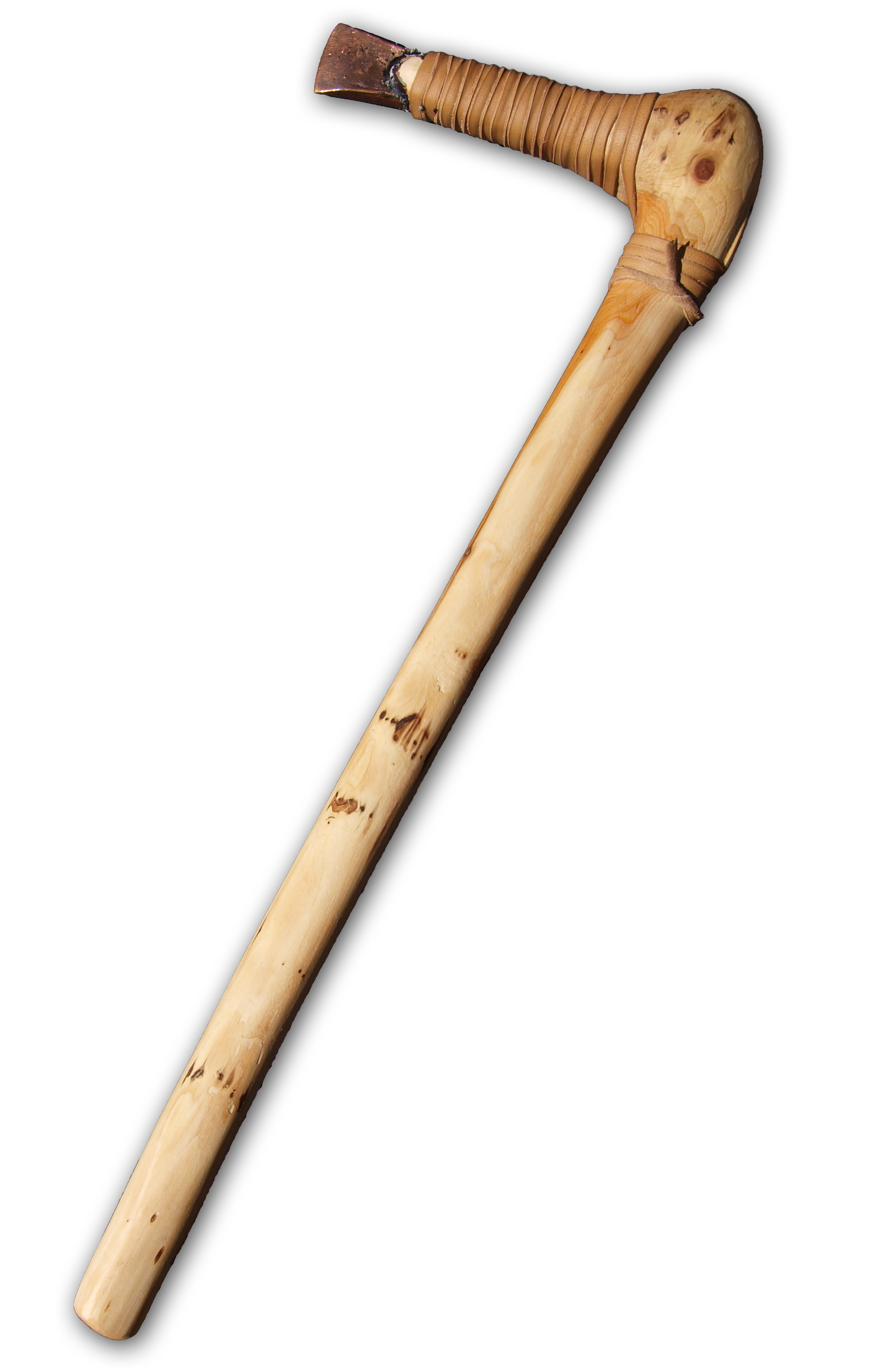
Reconstruction of Ötzi's ax with a polished copper tip

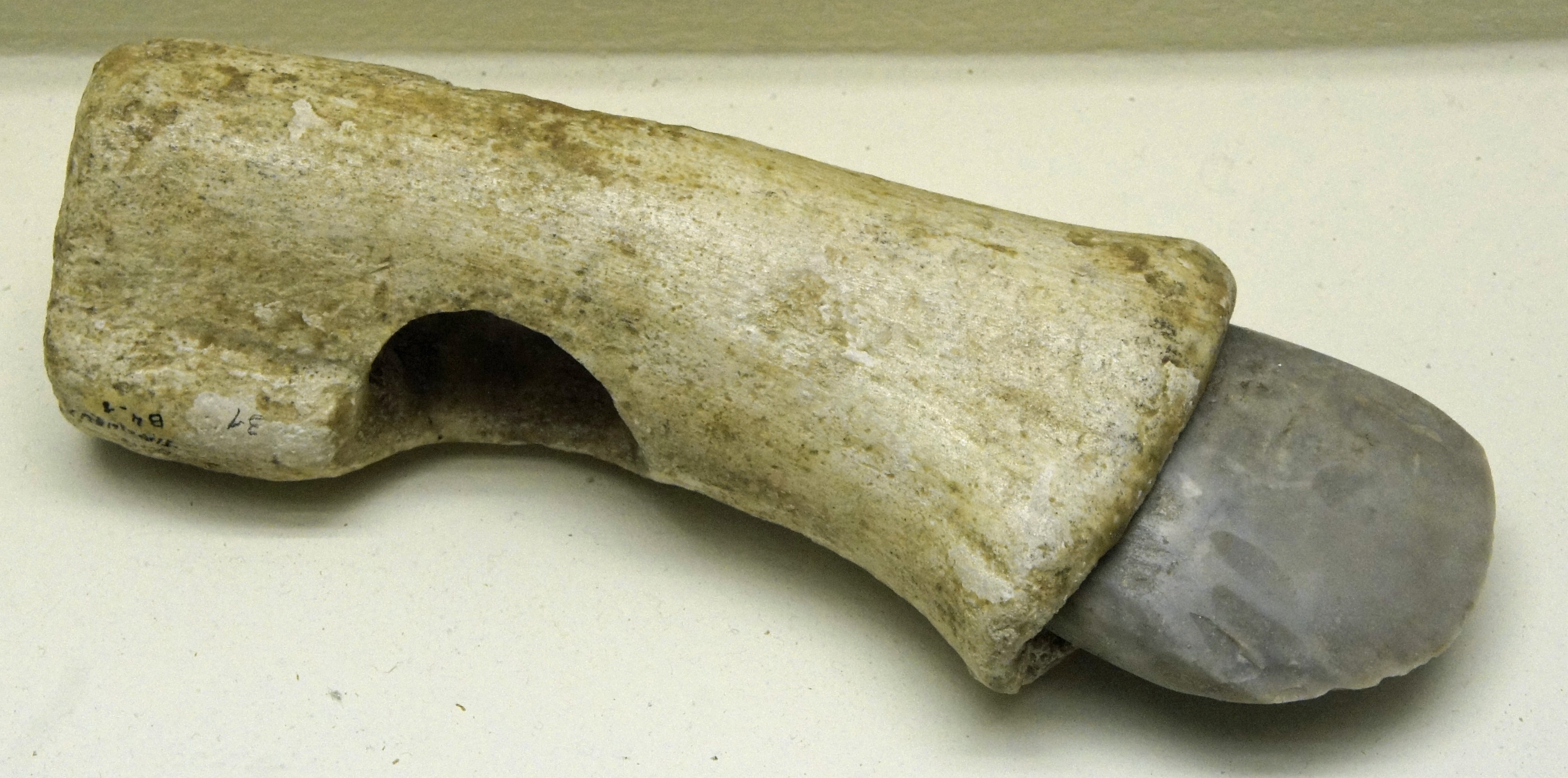
Flint ax in a stag horn stand.

=== Neolithic ===
The replacement of cut stone tools by polished stone tools is not the most important innovation, although it is the one that gives the period its name. The diversification of tasks that needed to be done (cutting down trees, sowing seeds, harvesting cereals, much of the grain...) explains that the first farmers had to create new specific tools for each function. Most utensils were made of flint with a wooden handle, others were made of bone and animal horn. They made pottery to store food, fabric for clothing with wool and linen, musical instruments, et cetera.

The mortice and tenon coupling was used to join the planks of the ancient Greek ships with double box and false wick. This set was fixed with a wooden peg on each side. The construction system of the large ships of antiquity (the chaining with a guarantor of the lining plates) was of Phoenician origin. The Romans called it "Phoenician chains" ("coagmenta punicana", in Latin plural).

=== Bronze Age ===
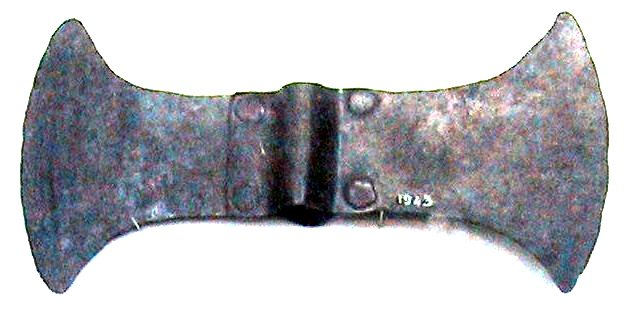
Bronze ax from the Messara tombs. Two riveted pieces.

=== Phoenicians and Carthaginians ===
Coupling principle of the planks of the ancient Greek ships with double box and false wick

The mortice and tenon coupling was used to join the planks of the ancient Greek ships with double box and false wick. This set was fixed with a wooden peg on each side. The construction system of the large ships of antiquity (the chaining with a guarantor of the lining plates) was of Phoenician origin. The Romans called it "Phoenician joints" ("coagmenta punicana", in Latin plural).

=== Ancient Egypt ===
The images show three material assemblies representing three mechanical joints and the corresponding joint elements. The first example, a solar boat, recalls the sewn joints of the wooden pieces that make up the boat's hull. In this particular case the joints were reinforced with box and wick fittings. The second example is that of the wheels of a war chariot. The button of a wheel was formed by the union of the six "vertices" of six pieces of wood - each bent at an angle - so that each spoke was formed by the union of two arms of contiguous angular pieces. The third example is based on the funerary mask of Tutankhamun and shows a kind of soft welding for metals.

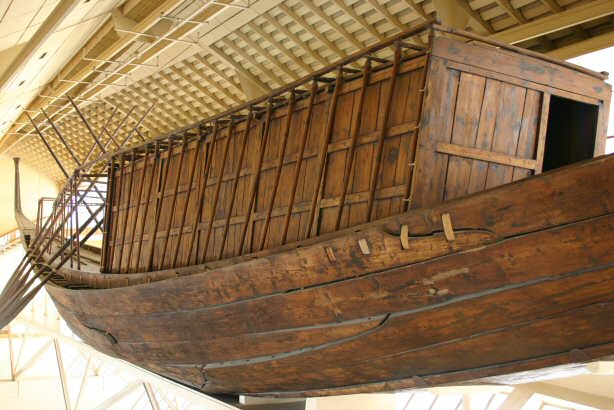
Keops solar boat

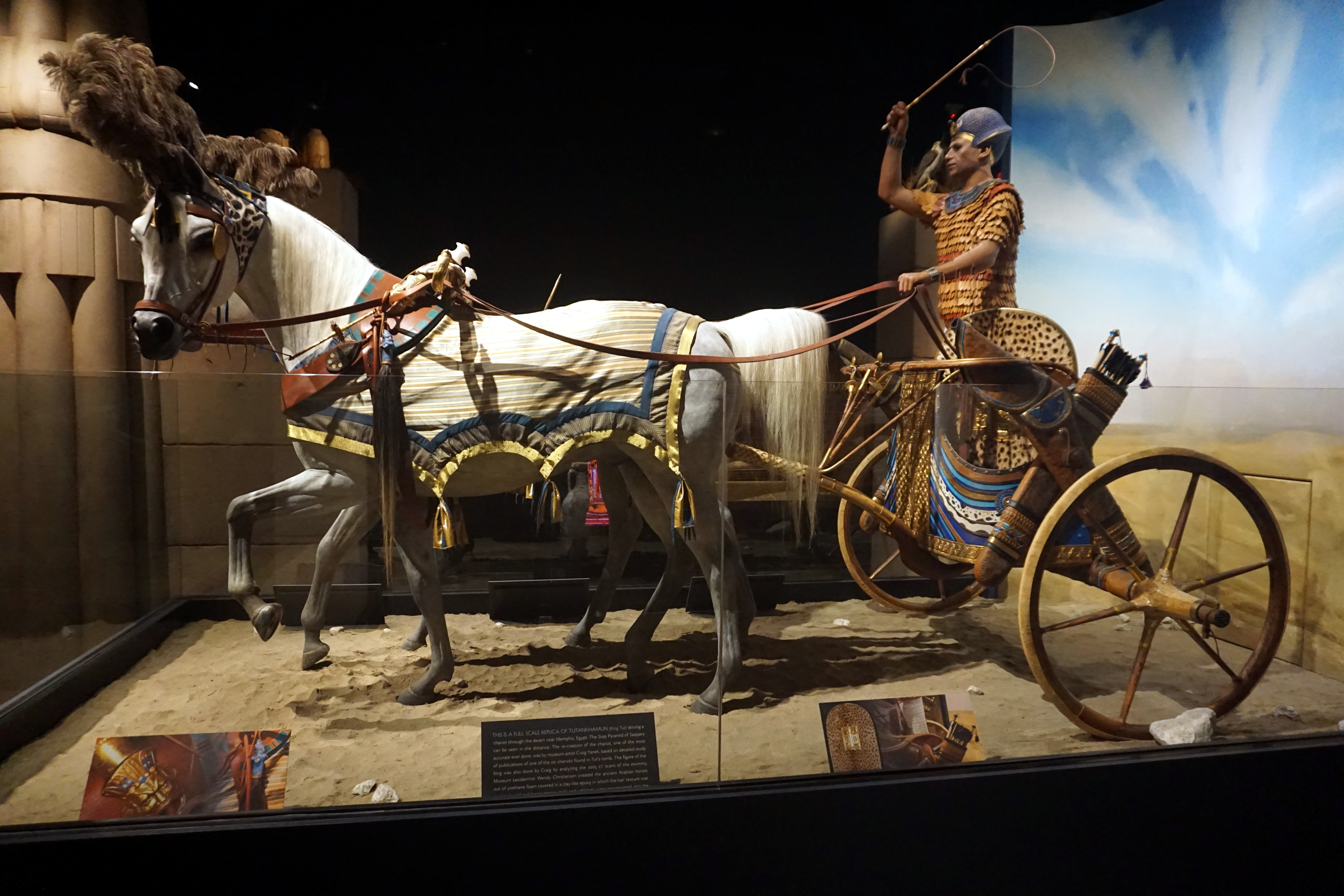
Copy of a war chariot.

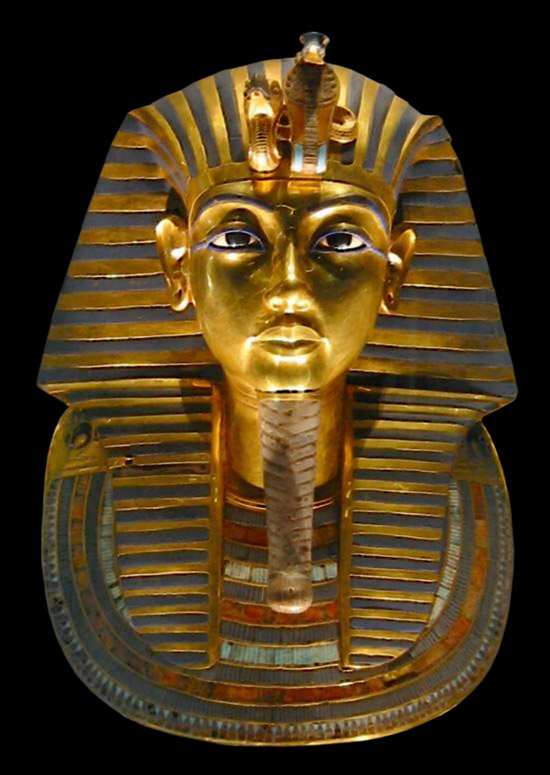
Tutankamon Mask with soldered beard.

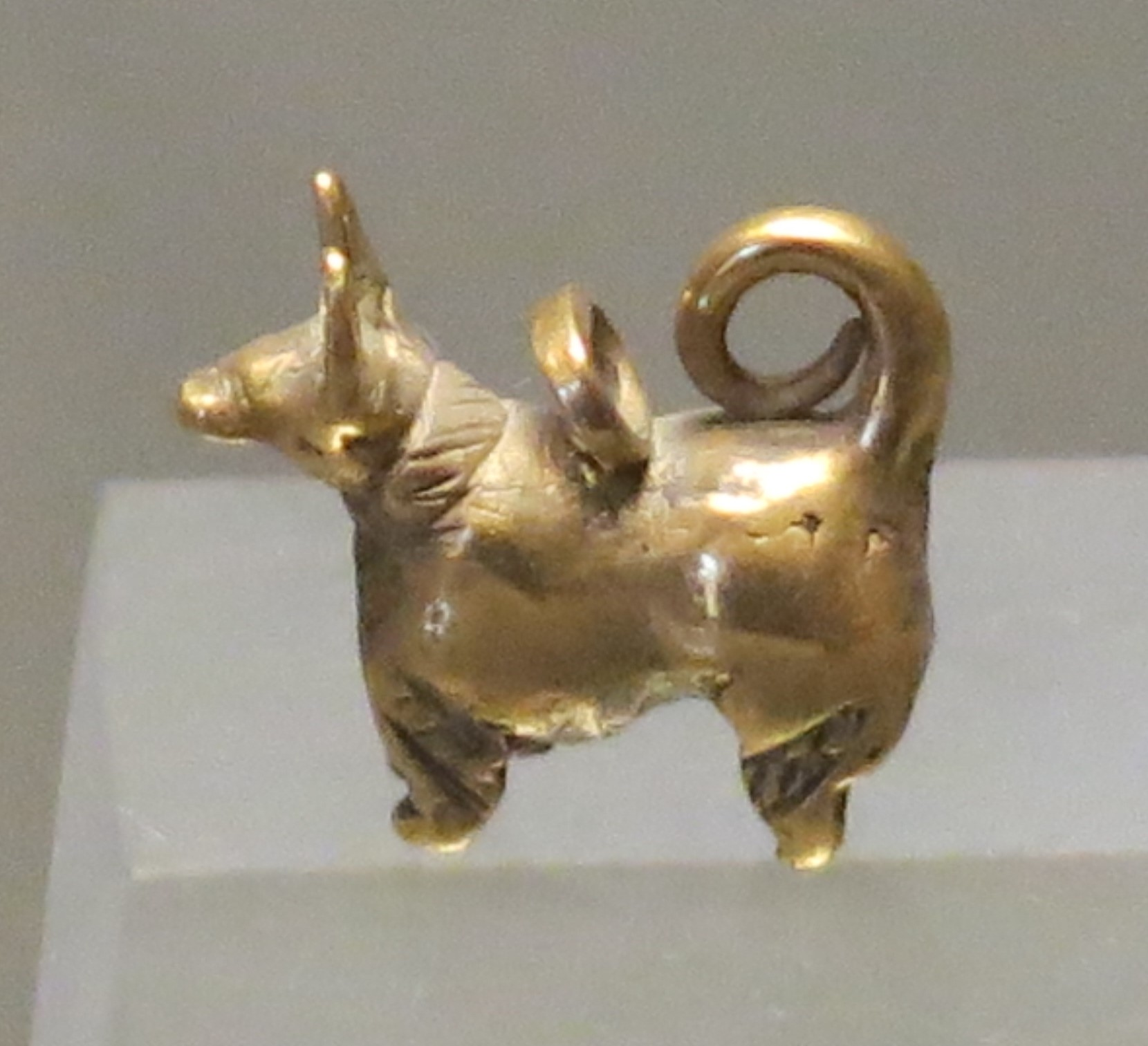
Petit chien à bélière with brazed ring.

=== Ancient Greece ===
Classical Greek culture offers many examples of ensembles made up of pieces mechanically joined together. The following sets are randomly presented: a hoplite spear, a hoplite shield, a mechanical system for chariot racing, the Antikythera mechanism, and general war machines.

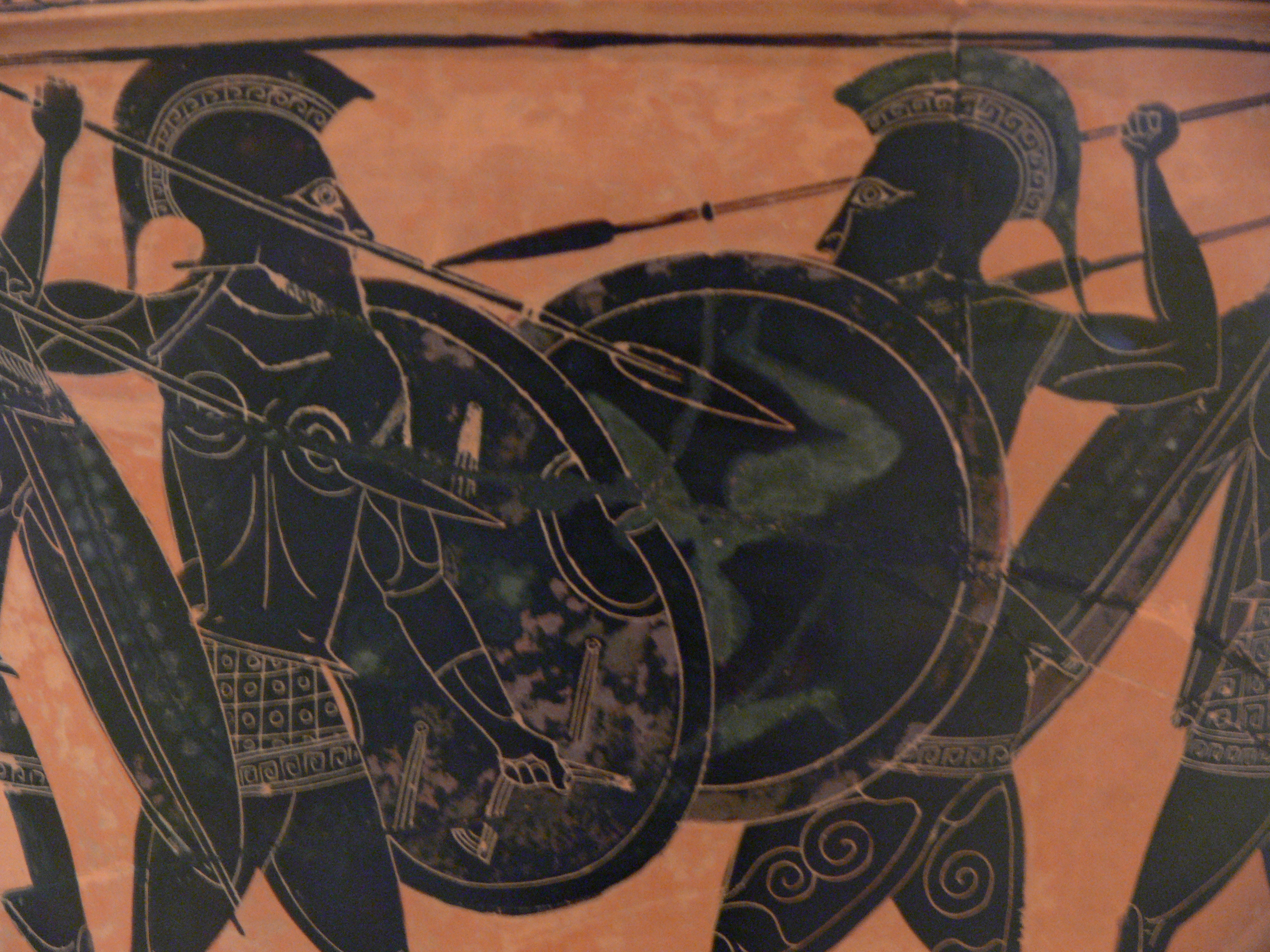
Figure 1. Two hoplites fighting with their spears.

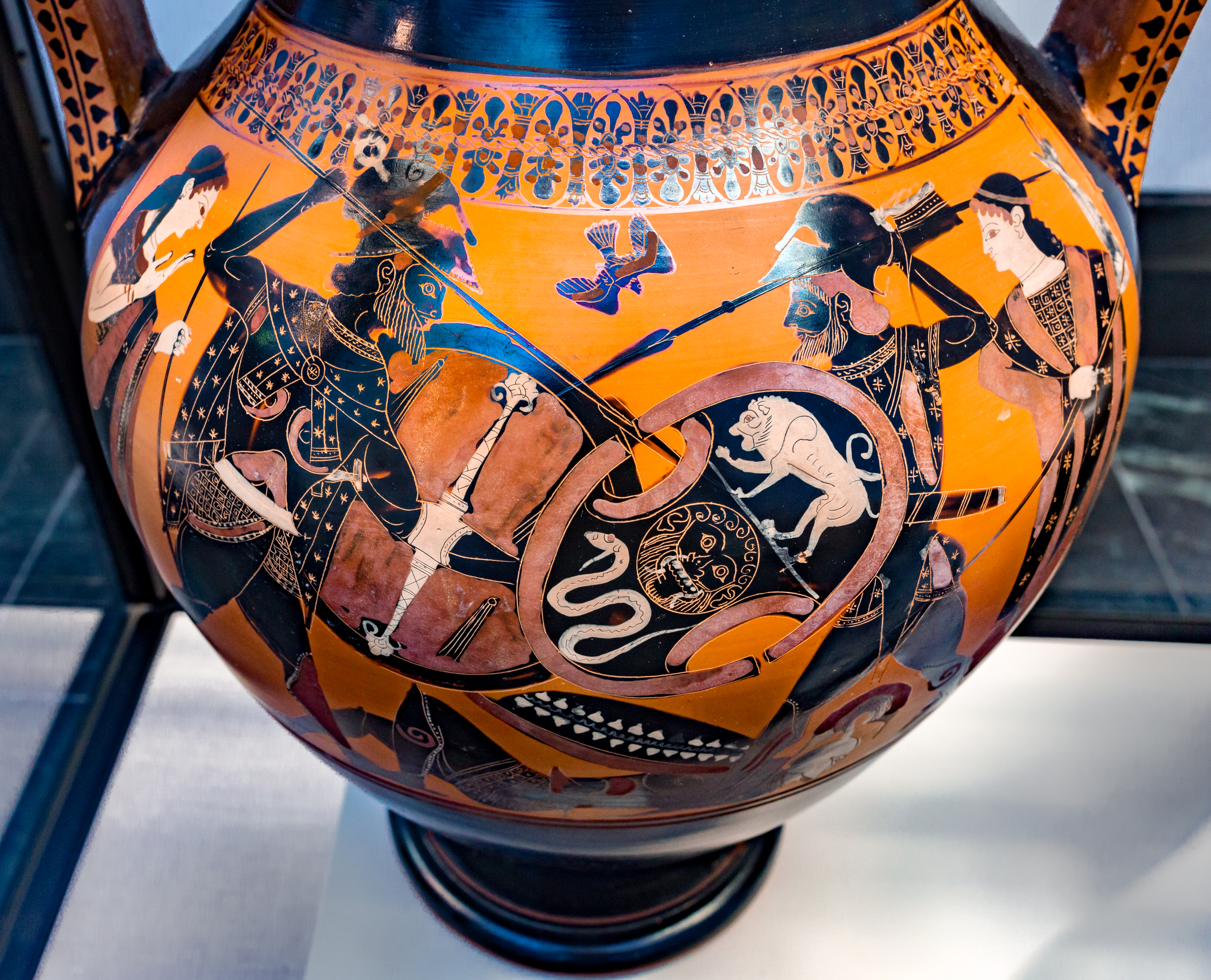
Figure 2. Combat between two hoplites showing the system of hanging and grabbing the shield.

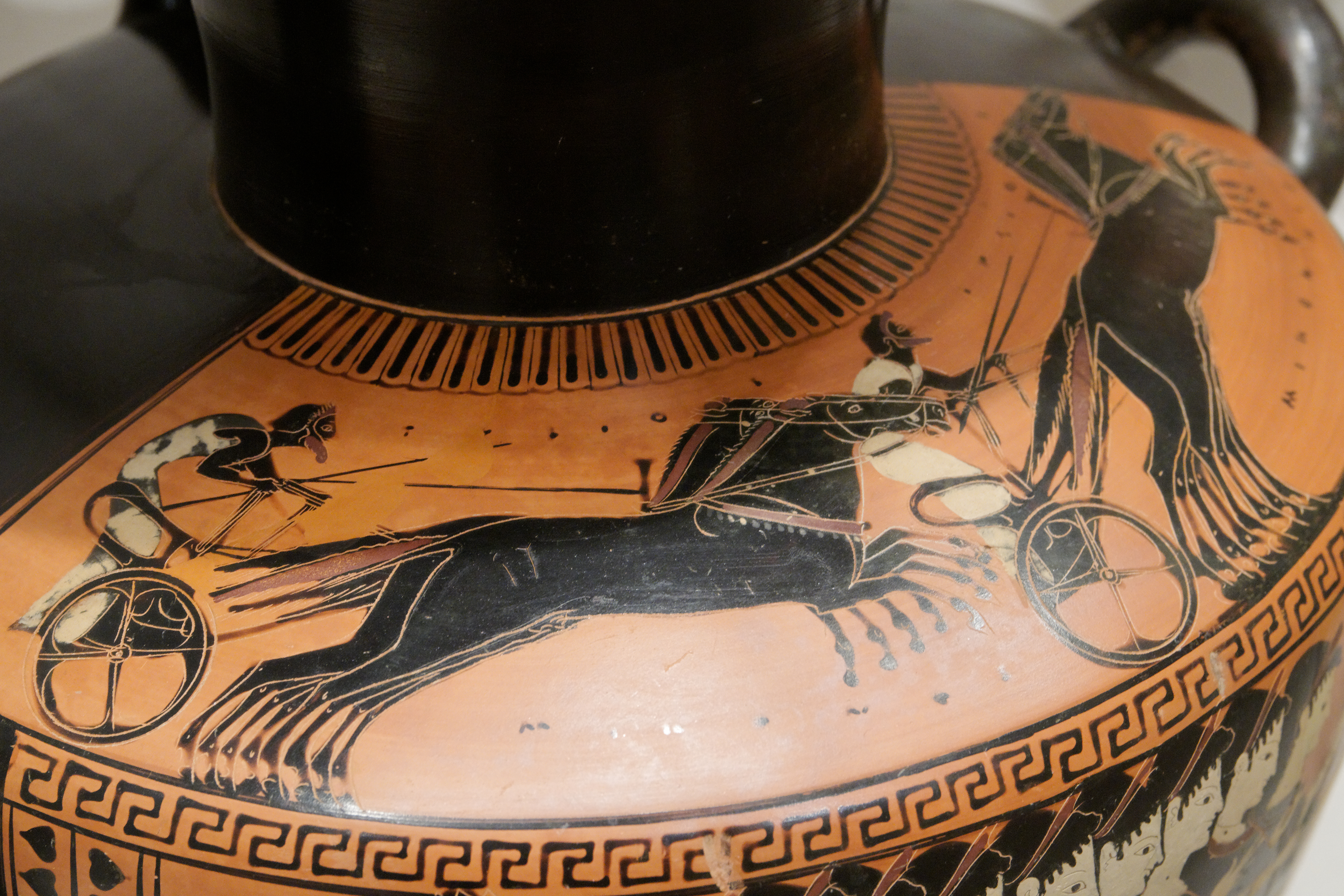
Figure 3. Chariot races

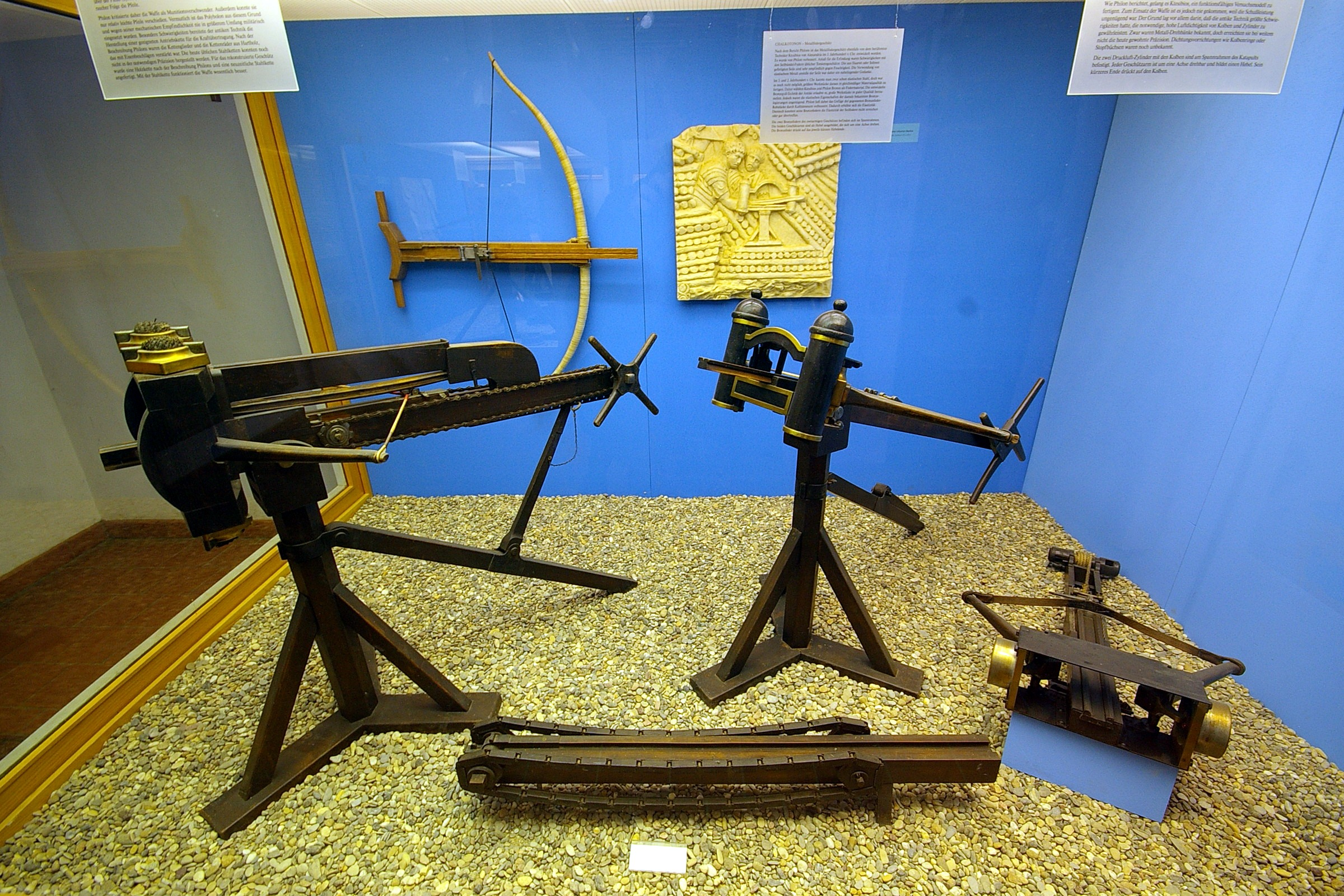
Figure 4. Reproductions of ancient Greek or Roman war machines

In figure 1 you can see a Greek spear made up of three parts: the tip (of bronze or steel), the shaft (of ash or a similar wood) and the shaft (of bronze or steel). This set involves two unions.

=== Viking Era ===
The ships of the Vikings, the drakkars, had (almost all) tingled hulls.

The juxtaposed lath system was the most popular on the Mediterranean coast. Boats, oxen, gussies and ships of great harbor had ships according to this arrangement. The tingled can method (in which each can overlaps the bottom can) was typical of the Atlantic coasts. An example would be the ships of the Vikings, the drakkars. The method of sewing the tins was followed in various parts of the world, with examples in the Nordic countries and on the coasts of the Indian Ocean.

The union of two planks in a drakkar was secured by means of iron rivets (or nails with a dome on the outside and a bent point on the inside). The tightness was obtained with moss or wool impregnated with resin or glue.

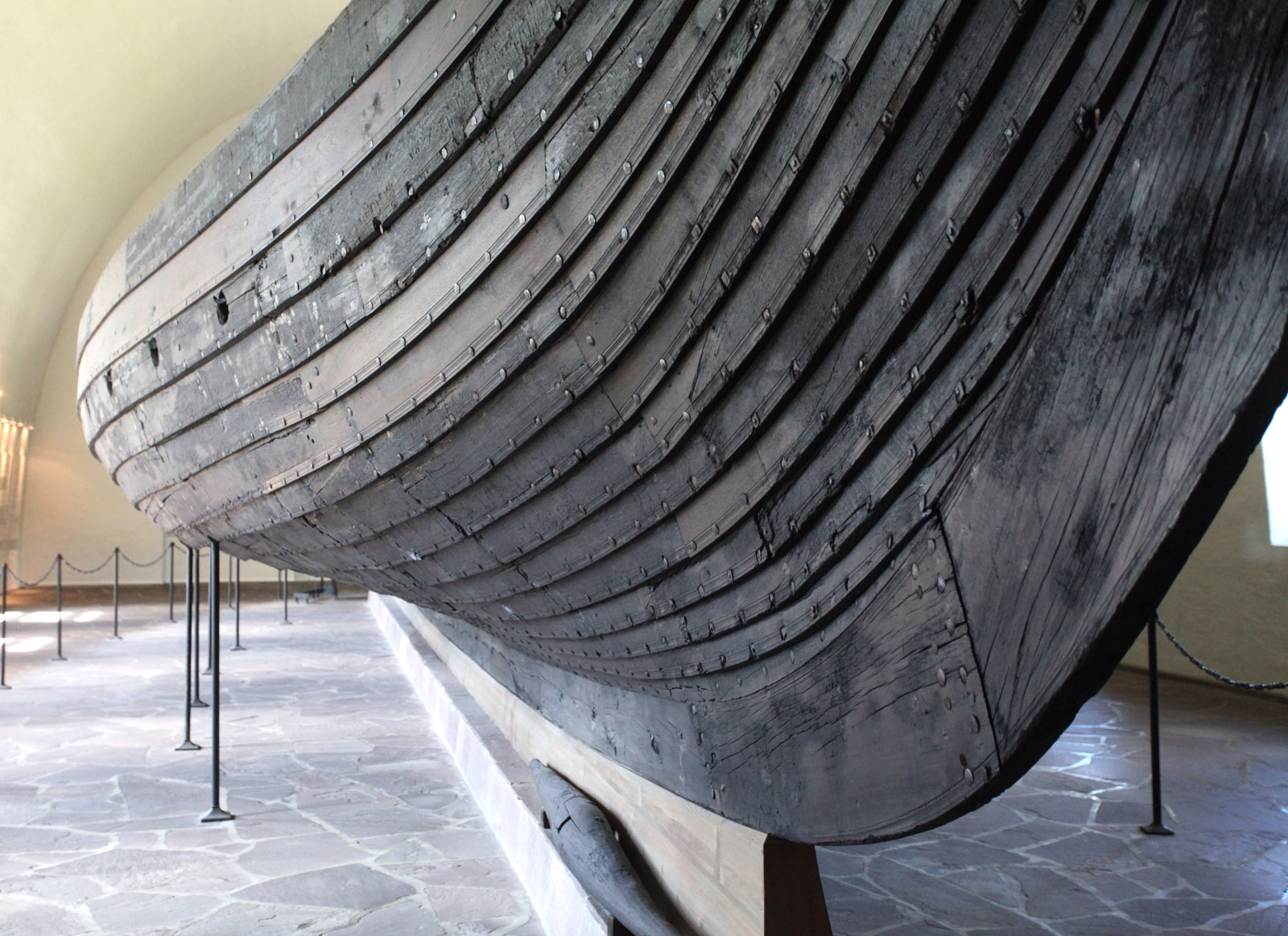

== Patents ==
Since about the fifteenth century, joining technologies have been the subject of patents and similar actions. Here follows a small, random sample, arranged chronologically. The listed patents include assembly tools for mounting or tightening fasteners.

- 1891 The Swedish company Bahco attributes an improved design, in 1891 or 1892, to the Swedish inventor Johan Petter Johansson who in 1892 received a patent.
- 1909 Allen screws.
- 1944 Blind rivets
- 1981 Pozidriv screws.

== See also ==
- Structural support, point in a structure at which loads are transferred between structural elements
- Cross bracing, point in a structure at which loads are transferred between structural elements
- Grid bracing, mathematical problem of making a structure rigid
