= Labyrinth seal =

Mechanical seal consisting of tightly interlinked parts to prevent leakage

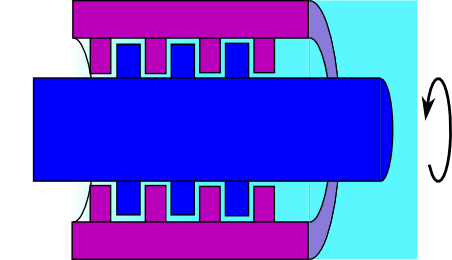
A simple labyrinth seal

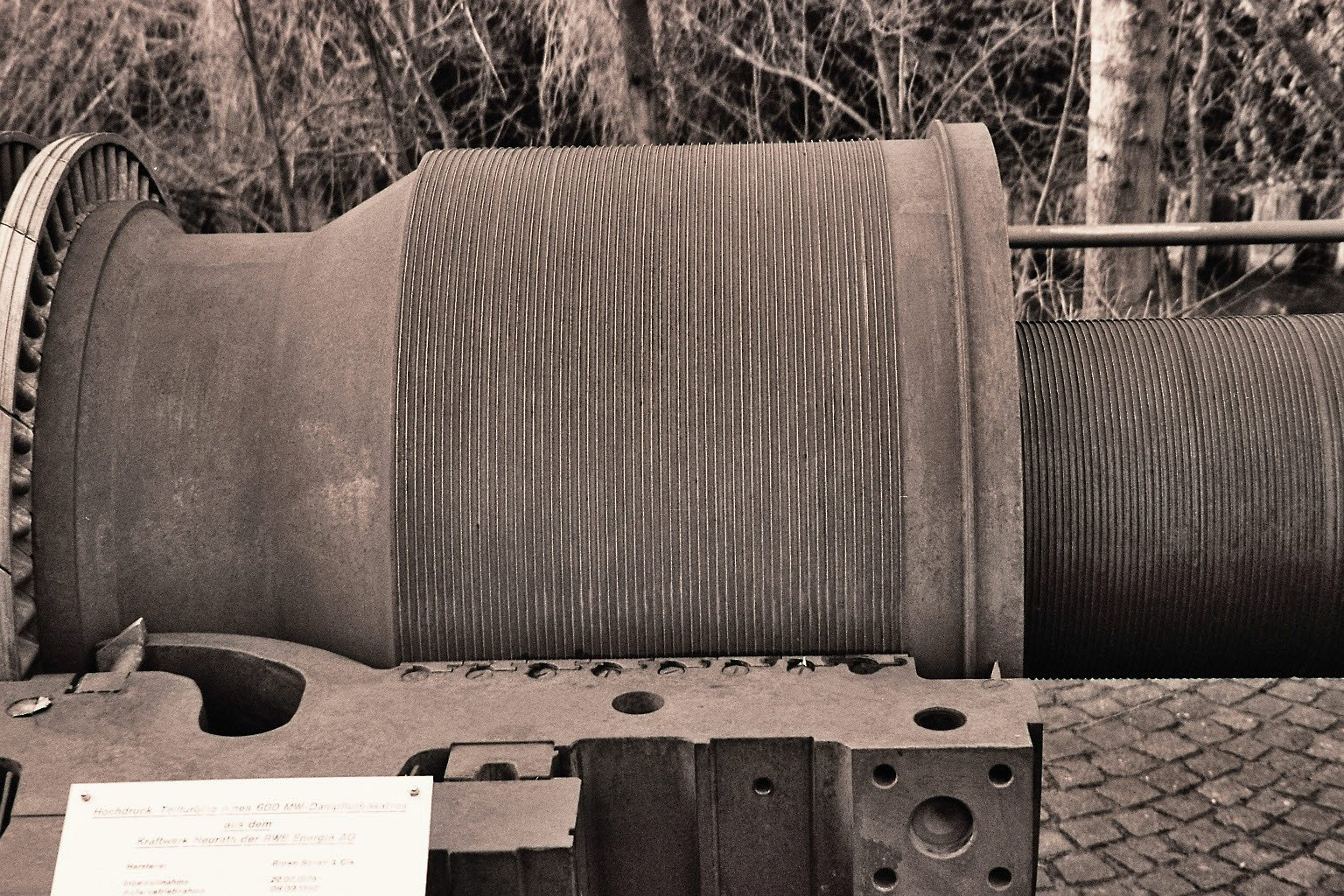
A labyrinth seal on a steam turbine shaft

A labyrinth seal is a type of mechanical seal that provides a tortuous path to help prevent leakage. An example of such a seal is sometimes found within an axle's bearing to help prevent the leakage of the oil lubricating the bearing.

A labyrinth seal may be composed of many grooves that press tightly inside another axle, or inside a hole, so that the fluid has to pass through a long and difficult path to escape. Sometimes screw threads exist on the outer and inner portion. These interlock, to produce the long characteristic path which slows leakage. For labyrinth seals on a rotating shaft, a very small clearance must exist between the tips of the labyrinth threads and the running surface. The "teeth" of the labyrinth seal may be on the rotating shaft (teeth on rotor - TOR) or on the stator (TOS), or both, in an interlocking configuration.

Labyrinth seals on rotating shafts provide non-contact sealing action by controlling the passage of fluid through a variety of chambers by centrifugal motion, as well as by the formation of controlled fluid vortices. At higher speeds, centrifugal motion forces the liquid towards the outside and therefore away from any passages. Similarly, if the labyrinth chambers are correctly designed, any liquid that has escaped the main chamber becomes entrapped in a labyrinth chamber, where it is forced into a vortex-like motion. This acts to prevent its escape, and also acts to repel any other fluid. Because these labyrinth seals are non-contact, they do not wear out.

Many gas turbine engines, having high rotational speeds, use labyrinth seals due to their lack of friction and long life. Because liquid-filled labyrinth seals still generate heat due to the viscosity of the seal oil, and because seal oil can contaminate the process fluids, modern high-performance gas turbines use dry gas seals which use spring-loaded rings with an inert gas in between the faces of the rings to provide the seal. This creates even lower friction and provides a liquid-free seal. However, such engines often have detectable oil leakage into the compression chamber. Indeed, many gas turbine engine seals leak by design.

Labyrinth seals are also found on pistons, which use them to store oil and seal against high pressure during compression and power strokes, as well as on non-rotating shafts. In these applications, it is the long and difficult path and the formation of controlled fluid vortices plus some limited contact-sealing action that creates the seal.

== See also ==
- Tesla valve
