= Stuffing box =

Assembly that houses a gland seal

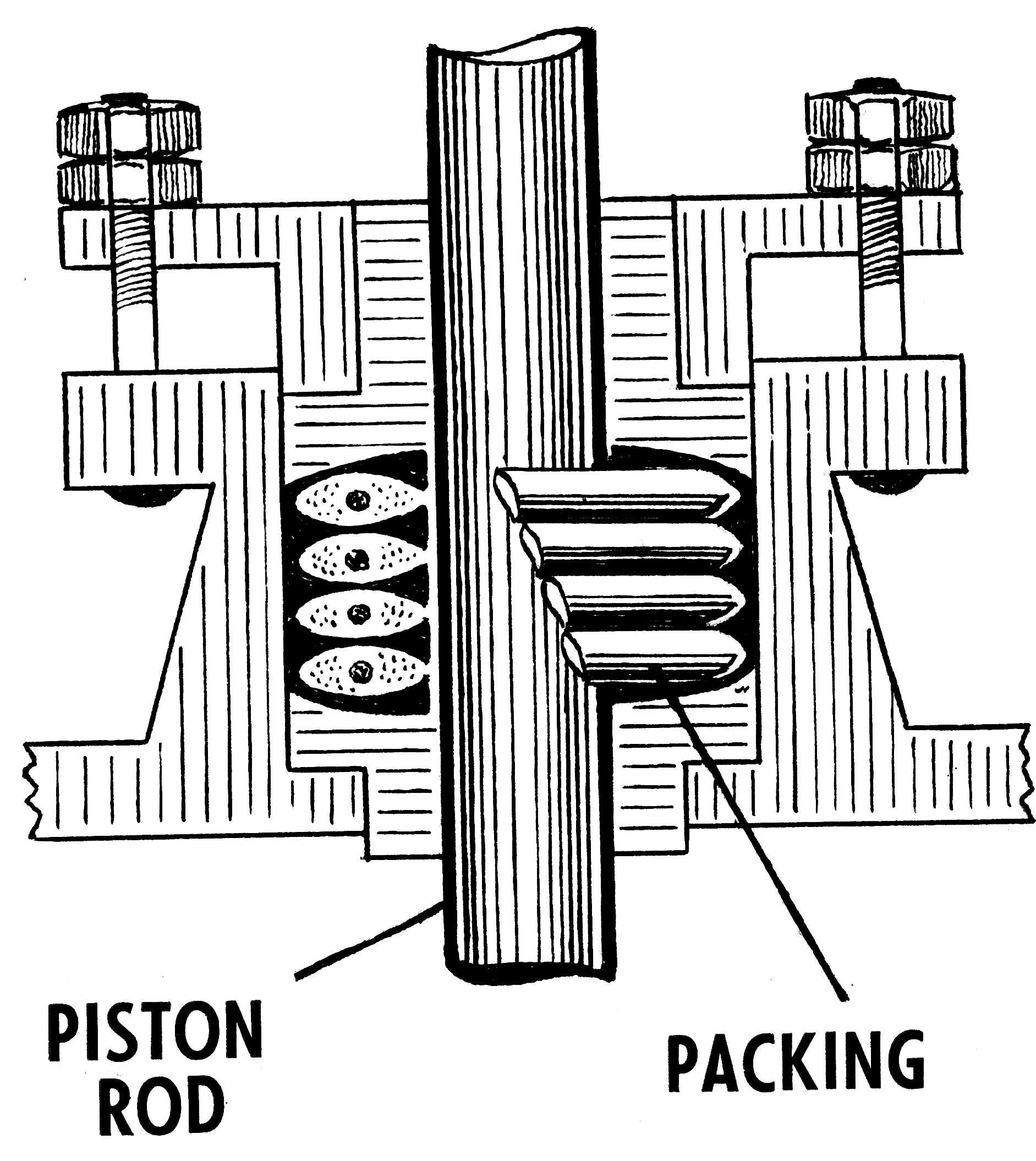
Schematic view of a stuffing box

A stuffing box or gland package is an assembly which is used to house a gland seal. It is used to prevent leakage of fluid, such as water or steam, between sliding or turning parts of machine elements.

== Components ==
On a boat, a stuffing box typically consists of a stern tube, which is slightly larger than the prop shaft, and a gland nut or packing nut, which threads onto the stern tube. The two compress packing material wrapped around the shaft, which passes through the assembly from the motor to the propeller.

Creating a proper plunger alignment is critical for correct flow and a long wear life. Stuffing box components are of stainless steel, brass or other application-specific materials. Compression packing is rigorously tested to ensure effective sealing in valves, pumps, agitators, and other rotary equipment.

== Gland ==
A gland is a general type of stuffing box, used to seal a rotating or reciprocating shaft against a fluid. The most common example is in the head of a tap (faucet) where the gland is usually packed with string which has been soaked in tallow or similar grease. The gland nut allows the packing material to be compressed to form a watertight seal and prevent water leaking up the shaft when the tap is turned on. The gland at the rotating shaft of a centrifugal pump may be packed in a similar way and graphite grease used to accommodate continuous operation. The linear seal around the piston rod of a double acting steam piston is also known as a gland, particularly in marine applications. Likewise the shaft of a handpump or wind pump is sealed with a gland where the shaft exits the borehole.

Other types of sealed connections without moving parts are also sometimes called glands; for example, a cable gland or fitting that connects a flexible electrical conduit to an enclosure, machine or bulkhead facilitates assembly and prevents liquid or gas ingress.

== Applications ==
=== Boats ===
On boats, the stuffing box seals a boat’s propeller shaft to prevent the entry of water, while allowing the shaft to rotate. Three types of stuffing boxes have specialized application. Most powerboats use a rigid stuffing box, sailboats use a flexible stuffing box, and modern examples of both are likely to use flexible shaft seals, which use bellows instead of packing. Stuffing box packing may be made from flax, Teflon, or graphite. Flax packing uses grease-infused flax. Teflon packing is more durable, but harder to adjust for leakage rate. Graphite packing is intrinsically a lubricant, but is expensive and may promote corrosion.

=== Steam engines ===
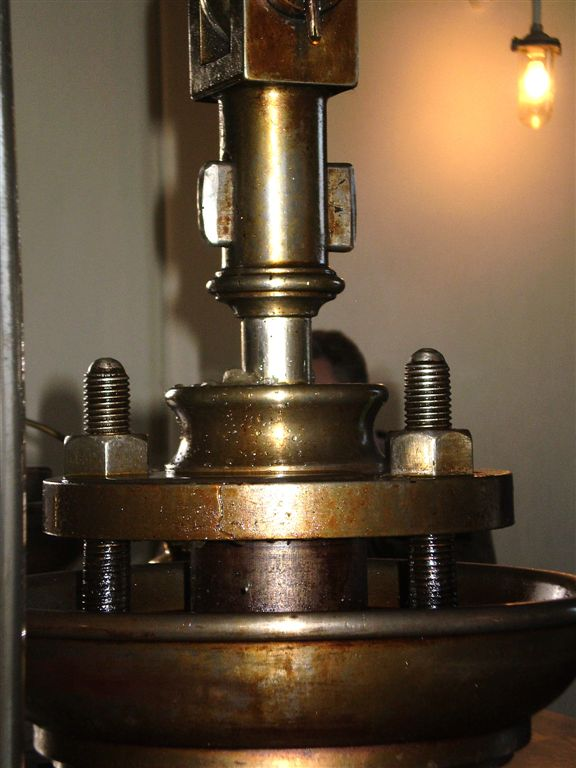
A rod coming out of a stuffing box on a steam engine

In a steam engine, where the piston rod reciprocates through the cylinder cover, a stuffing box provided in the cylinder cover prevents the leakage of steam from the cylinder.

=== Pumpjacks ===
A pumpjack uses a reciprocating sucker rod to lift crude oil from a well. As natural gas is often found in oil formations, a stuffing box around the sucker shaft maintains a seal at the wellhead. Natural gas leaks, particularly methane, are a potent greenhouse gas emission, and so must be drawn off to either a flare stack or be refined further into fuel gas.

== See also ==
- Axlebox
- Bilge
- Compression seal fitting
- Journal bearing
- Journal box
- Labyrinth seal
