= Bluefors =

Finnish cryogenics company

- Type: Private
- Industry: Cryogenics
- Founded: 17 March 2008; 18 years ago
- Founders: Rob Blaauwgeers; Pieter Vorselman
- Headquarters: Helsinki, Finland
- Area served: Worldwide
- Key people: Kim Povlsen (CEO); Kimmo Alkio (Chairman)
- Products: Dilution refrigerators, cryocoolers, cryogenic measurement systems
- Revenue: Over €200 million (2024)
- Number of employees: Over 600 (2024)
- Website: bluefors.com

Bluefors is a Finnish company specializing in cryogenic products used in several high-tech industries. Cryogenic solutions are integral to advancements in quantum computing and scientific research. The company offers cryogenic systems, including dilution refrigerators and cryocoolers, which are essential for applications requiring ultra-low temperatures. Cryocoolers are for instance a requirement for today's superconducting qubits to function.

In response to increasing global demand, the company has expanded its operations. Notable acquisitions include Cryomech in the USA and Rockgate in Japan. Bluefors also have a laboratory in Delft, the Netherlands.

As of 2024, Bluefors reported annual revenue exceeding €200 million and employed over 600 staff worldwide.
