= Cryogenic processor =

Unit for cooling to ultra-low temperatures

A cryogenic processor is a device engineered to reduce the temperature of an object to cryogenic levels, typically around −300°F (−184.44°C), at a moderate rate in order to prevent thermal shock to the components being treated. The inception of commercial cryogenic processors dates back to the late 1960s, pioneered by Ed Busch. The development of programmable microprocessor controls allowed machines to follow temperature profiles that increased the effectiveness of the process. Certain manufacturers integrate home computers into cryogenic processors to program the temperature profiles.

Before programmable controls were added to control cryogenic processors, the treatment process of an object was done manually by immersing the object in liquid nitrogen. This method often induced thermal shock, leading to structural cracks within the object. Contemporary cryogenic processors monitor temperature fluctuations and modulate the liquid nitrogen input to ensure that only fractional changes in temperature occur over a specific period of time. These temperature readings and adjustments are synthesized into profiles that are used to repeat the process when treating similarly grouped objects.

The standard processing cycle for contemporary cryogenic processors spans a three-day period, which includes 24 hours to reach the optimal minimum temperature for the product, 24 hours to hold the product at the minimum temperature, and 24 hours to return the product to room temperature. Certain items necessitate post-cryogenic heating in an oven to achieve higher temperatures. While some processors can provide both the negative and positive extreme temperatures, in some instances, distinct apparatuses like a cryogenic processor and a specialized oven may yield superior outcomes, contingent on the application.

The optimal minimum temperatures for objects, as well as the hold times involved, are determined by utilizing different research methods and are backed by analysis of the product to determine the optimum procedure for a particular product. The advent of novel metals and their amalgamations in new market products may necessitate alterations to processing profiles to suit these materials. Additionally, thermal profiles might be revised in response to insights from case studies conducted by either the manufacturer or the clientele of cryogenic services. When a cryogenic processor is manufactured, the thermal profiles for the year of manufacture will be included. Nonetheless, profiles originating from the initial engineering phase of the processor model could be antiquated. Manufacturers facing budget constraints might include obsolete profiles with processors due to limited research funding.

To find thermal profiles for cryogenics, a number of companies maintain thermal profiles of various products that are updated for accuracy at regular intervals according to ongoing research, including data from independent trials and studies. Acquiring these profiles can pose challenges if their use is not educational, primarily within institutional research contexts, as they typically only provide the updated profiles to their longtime service center partners.

It is asserted that cryogenic processors have revolutionized the domain of cryogenics. Previously, cryogenics was largely theoretical, with inconsistent results from incremental improvements. Ongoing research aims to increase the accuracy of temperature treatment profiles, as well as the efficiency of hardware and associated control systems.

== See also ==
- Absolute zero
- Cryogenics
- Cryogenic tempering
- Cryocoolers
- Coldest temperature achieved on earth
- Refrigeration
- Superfluidity
- Superconductivity
- Quantum hydrodynamics
