= Refrigerated transport Dewar =

System to contain cryogenic liquids

A refrigerated transport Dewar is a refrigerated transport vessel with an insulated Dewar flask (vacuum) design to carry cryogenic liquid. To prevent pressure build-up they are equipped with safety relief valves and/or rupture discs. The liquid can be withdrawn as a gas by passing liquid through an internal vaporizer or as a liquid under its own vapour pressure.

== History ==
A non refrigerated air-transportable dewar for 750 liters of liquid hydrogen was developed by H.L. Johnston in c. 1952. The heat flow to the liquid hydrogen shell was 4 watts, boil-off about 7.5 liters per day, or 1% of the rated capacity. They were equipped with valves, instruments, and a vacuum pump.

The refrigerated transport dewar was based on a design by the Arthur D. Little Company and produced by the Cambridge Corporation using a closed cycle helium refrigerator, the 2000 liters of liquid hydrogen could be stored or transported indefinitely with no loss as long as the refrigerator was operated. It was placed on a 10.7-meter semi-trailer and weighed 18.1 metric tons, including a diesel generator for refrigerator operation away from electric power lines.

== See also ==
- Enthalpy of vaporization
- Hydrogen economy
- Timeline of hydrogen technologies
