= Dilution refrigerator =

Cryogenic device for cooling to very low temperatures

Phase diagram of liquid ^{3}He–^{4}He mixtures showing the phase separation

A ^{3}He/^{4}He dilution refrigerator, or simply dilution refrigerator, is a cryogenic device that provides continuous cooling to temperatures as low as 2 mK, with no moving parts in the low-temperature region. The cooling power is provided by the heat of mixing of the helium-3 and helium-4 isotopes.

The dilution refrigerator was first proposed by Heinz London in the early 1950s, and was experimentally realized in 1964 in the Kamerlingh Onnes Laboratorium at Leiden University.

== Theory of operation ==
The refrigeration process uses a mixture of the two stable isotopes of helium: helium-3 and helium-4. When cooled below approximately 870 millikelvins, the mixture undergoes spontaneous phase separation to form a ^{3}He-rich phase (the concentrated phase) and a ^{3}He-poor phase (the dilute phase). As shown in the phase diagram, at very low temperatures the concentrated phase is essentially pure ^{3}He, while the dilute phase contains about 6.6% ^{3}He and 93.4% ^{4}He. The working fluid is ^{3}He, which is circulated by vacuum pumps at room temperature. The ^{3}He enters the cryostat at a pressure of a few hundred millibar.

Schematic diagram of a wet ^{3}He/^{4}He dilution refrigerator without the outer vacuum shield

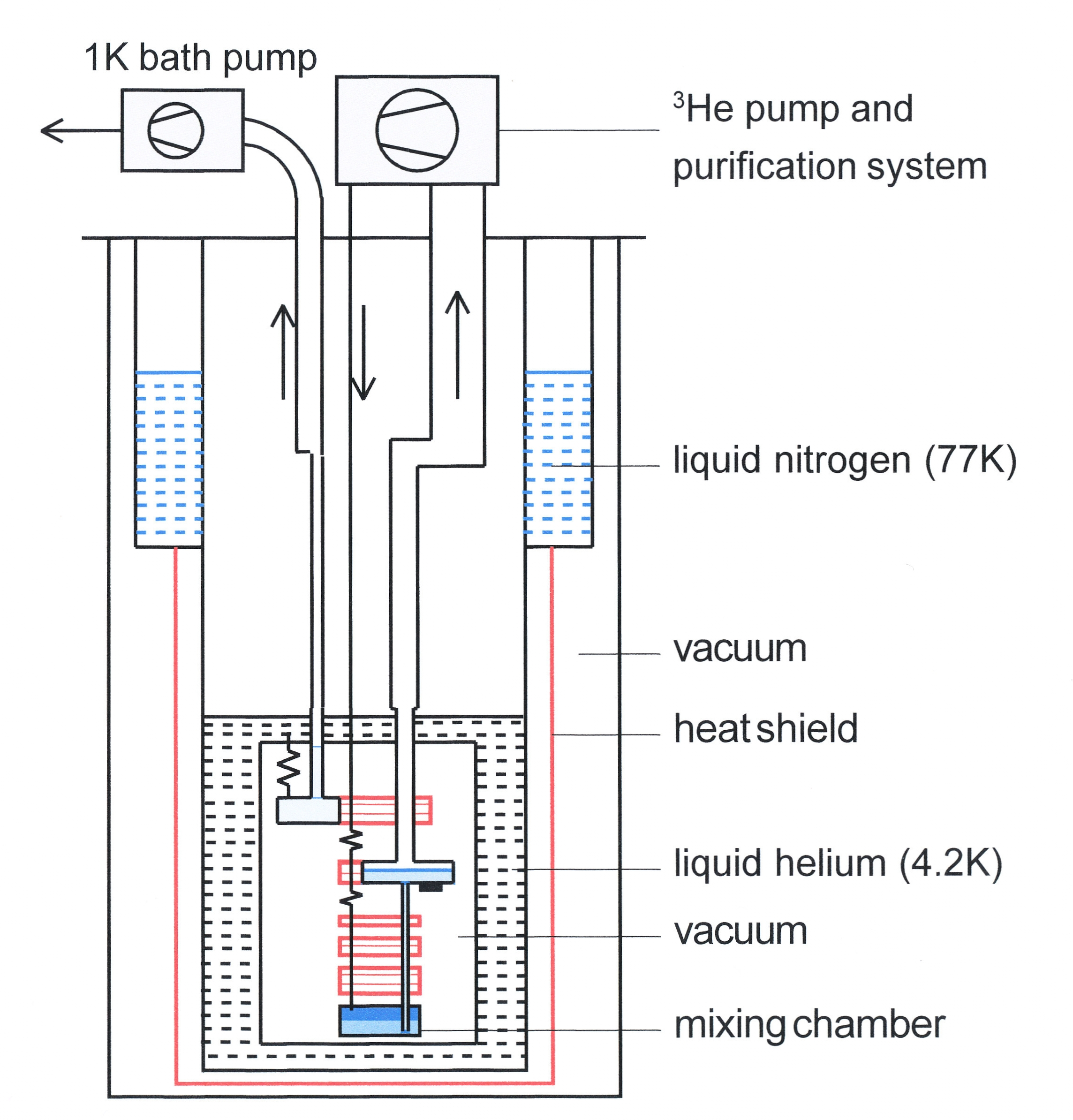
Schematic diagram of a standard, or wet, dilution refrigerator

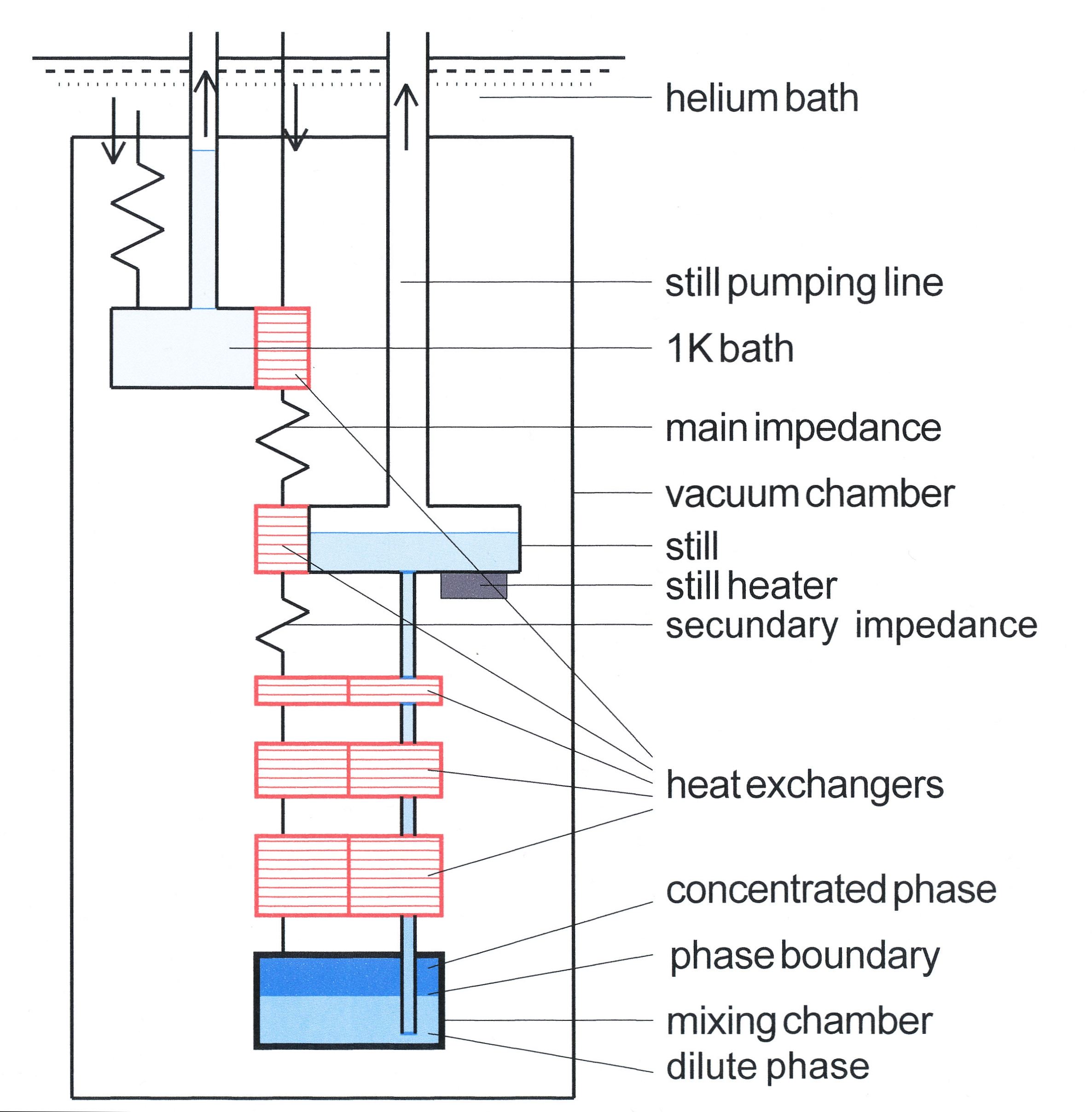
Schematic diagram of the low-temperature part of a dilution refrigerator

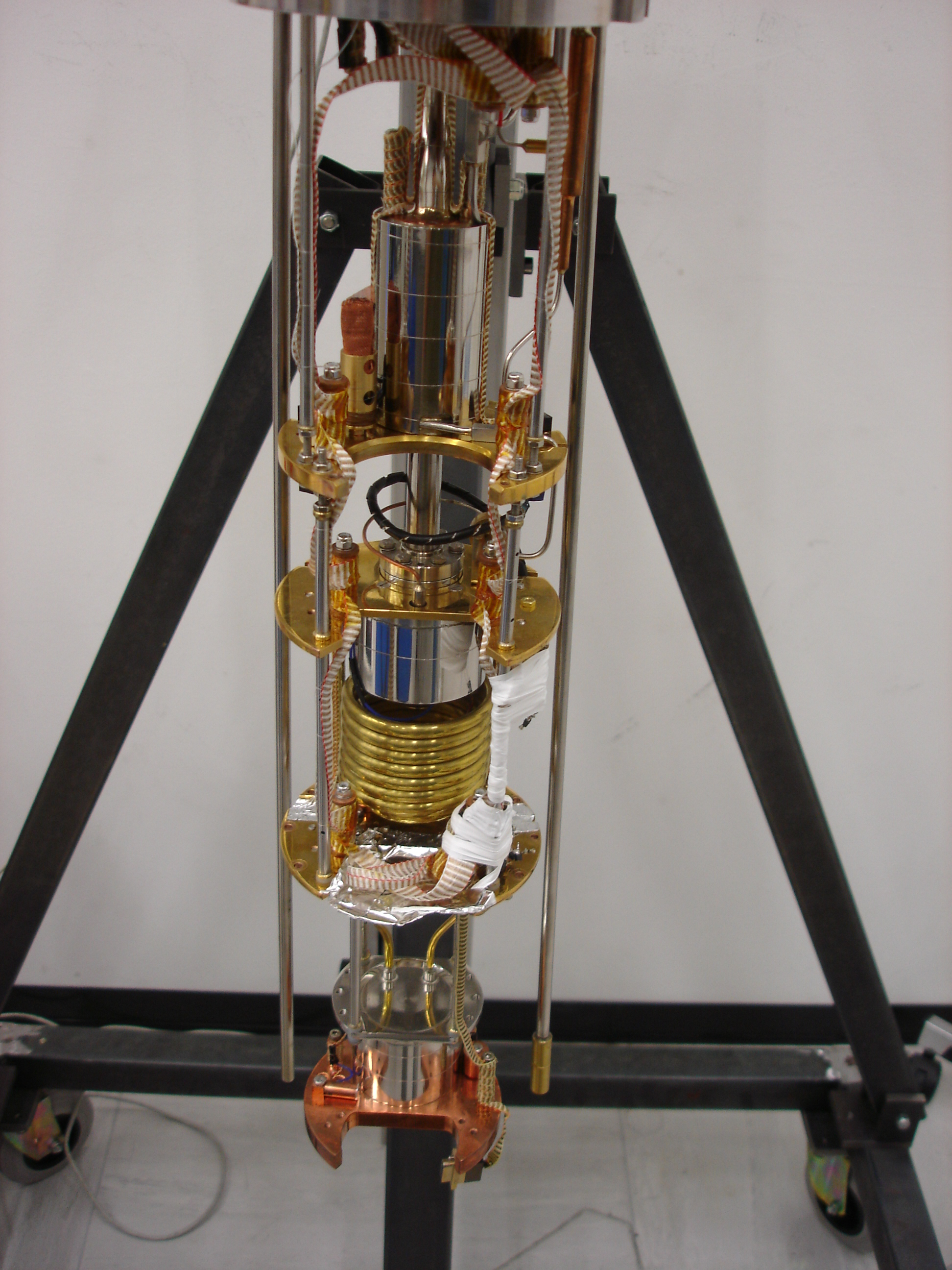
The inside of a wet Oxford Instruments helium dilution refrigerator, with the vacuum cans removed

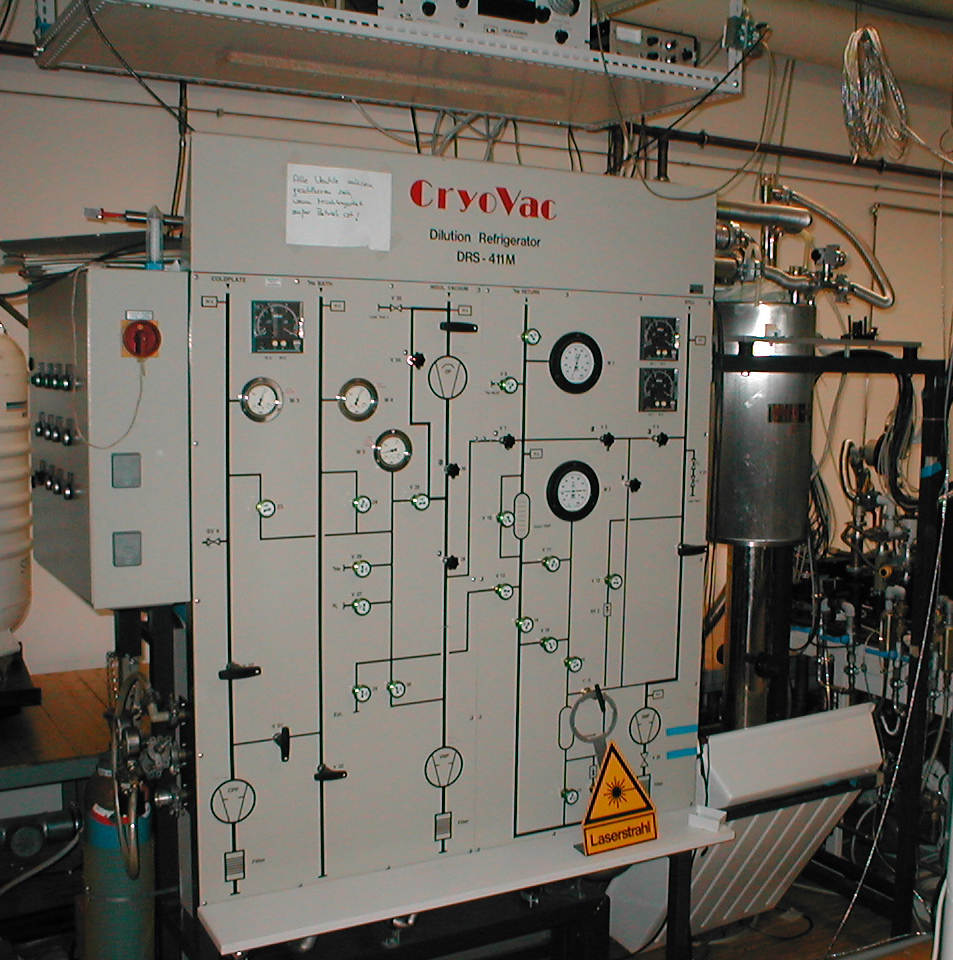
Gas control system for a helium dilution refrigerator

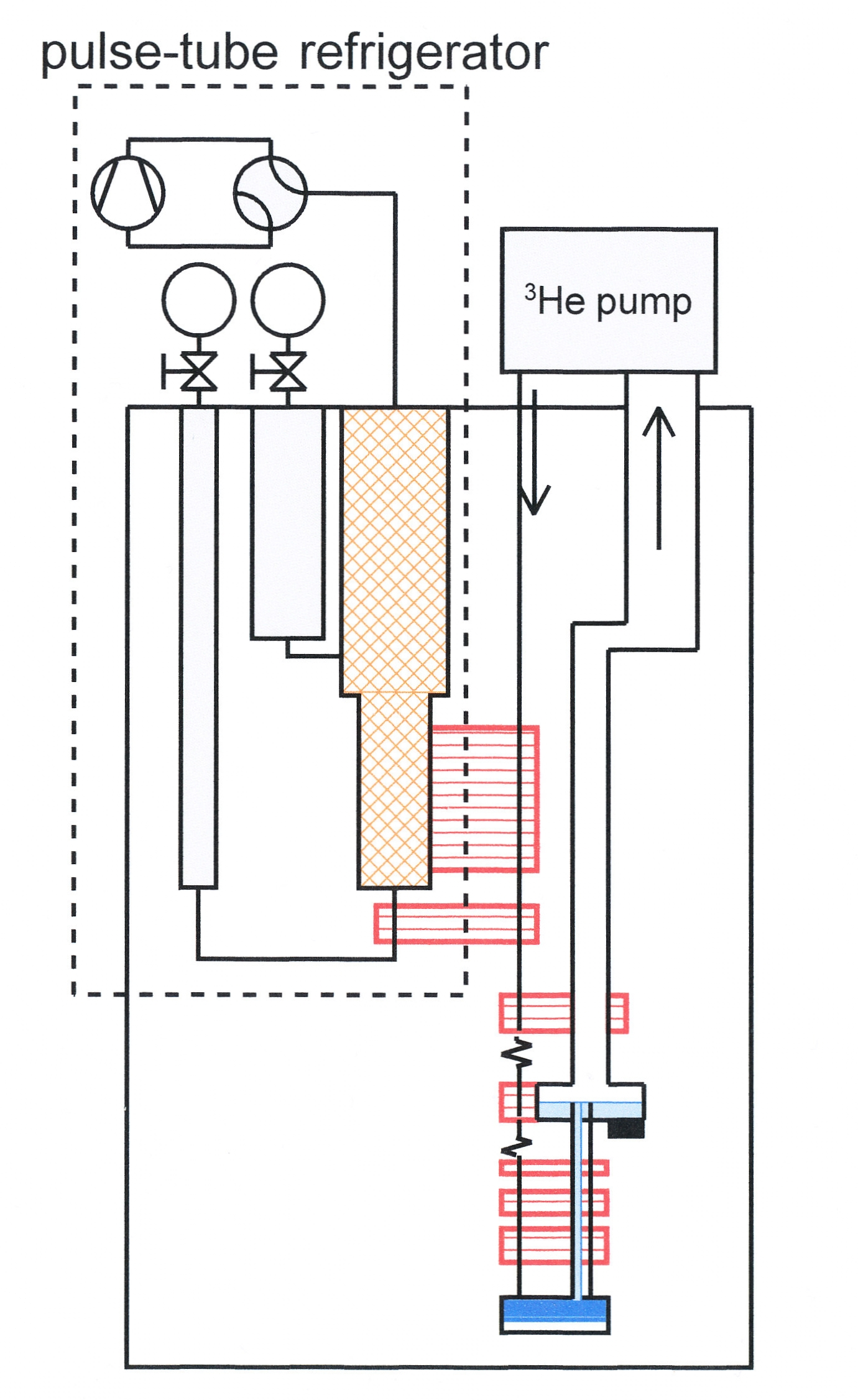
Schematic diagram of a cryogen-free, or dry, dilution refrigerator precooled by a two-stage pulse tube refrigerator, indicated by the dotted rectangle

=== Wet dilution refrigerators ===
In the classic dilution refrigerator (known as a wet dilution refrigerator), the ^{3}He is precooled and purified by liquid nitrogen at 77 K and a ^{4}He bath at 4.2 K. Next, the ^{3}He enters a vacuum chamber where it is further cooled to a temperature of 1.2–1.5 K by the 1 K bath, a vacuum-pumped ^{4}He bath (as decreasing the pressure of the helium reservoir depresses its boiling point). The 1 K bath liquefies the ^{3}He gas and removes the heat of condensation. The ^{3}He then enters the main impedance, a capillary with a large flow resistance. It is cooled by the still (described below) to a temperature 500–700 mK. Subsequently, the ^{3}He flows through a secondary impedance and one side of a set of counterflow heat exchangers where it is cooled by a cold flow of ^{3}He. Finally, the pure ^{3}He enters the mixing chamber, the coldest area of the device.

In the mixing chamber, two phases of the ^{3}He–^{4}He mixture, the concentrated phase (practically 100% ^{3}He) and the dilute phase (about 6.6% ^{3}He and 93.4% ^{4}He), are in equilibrium and separated by a phase boundary. Inside the chamber, the ^{3}He is diluted as it flows from the concentrated phase through the phase boundary into the dilute phase. The heat necessary for the dilution is the useful cooling power of the refrigerator, as the process of moving the ^{3}He through the phase boundary is endothermic and removes heat from the mixing chamber environment. The ^{3}He then leaves the mixing chamber in the dilute phase. On the dilute side and in the still the ^{3}He flows through superfluid ^{4}He which is at rest. The ^{3}He is driven through the dilute channel by a pressure gradient just like any other viscous fluid. On its way up, the cold, dilute ^{3}He cools the downward flowing concentrated ^{3}He via the heat exchangers and enters the still. The pressure in the still is kept low (about 10 Pa) by the pumps at room temperature. The vapor in the still is practically pure ^{3}He, which has a much higher partial pressure than ^{4}He at 500–700 mK. Heat is supplied to the still to maintain a steady flow of ^{3}He. The pumps compress the ^{3}He to a pressure of a few hundred millibar and feed it back into the cryostat, completing the cycle.

=== Dry dilution refrigerators ===
Modern dilution refrigerators (known as dry dilution refrigerators ) can precool the ^{3}He with a cryocooler in place of liquid nitrogen, liquid helium, and a 1 K bath. No external supply of cryogenic liquids is needed in these "dry cryostats" and operation can be highly automated. However, dry cryostats have high energy requirements and are subject to mechanical vibrations, such as those produced by pulse tube refrigerators. The first experimental machines were built in the 1990s, when (commercial) cryocoolers became available, capable of reaching a temperature lower than that of liquid helium and having sufficient cooling power (on the order of 1 Watt at 4.2 K). Pulse tube coolers are commonly used cryocoolers in dry dilution refrigerators.

Dry dilution refrigerators generally follow one of two designs. One design incorporates an inner vacuum can, which is used to initially precool the machine from room temperature down to the base temperature of the pulse tube cooler (using heat-exchange gas). However, every time the refrigerator is cooled down, a vacuum seal that holds at cryogenic temperatures needs to be made, and low temperature vacuum feed-throughs must be used for the experimental wiring. The other design is more demanding to realize, requiring heat switches that are necessary for precooling, but no inner vacuum can is needed, greatly reducing the complexity of the experimental wiring.

== Cooling power ==
The cooling power (in watts) at the mixing chamber is approximately given by

$$\dot{Q}_m\;[\text{W}] = \left(\dot{n}_3\;[\text{mol/s}]\right)\left(95(T_m\;[\text{K}])^2 - 11(T_i\;[\text{K}])^2\right)$$

where $\dot n_3$ is the ^{3}He molar circulation rate, T_{m} is the mixing-chamber temperature, and T_{i} the temperature of the ^{3}He entering the mixing chamber. There will only be useful cooling when

$$T_i < 2.8T_m.$$

This sets a maximum temperature of the last heat exchanger, as above this all cooling power is used up only cooling the incident ^{3}He.

Inside of a mixing chamber there is negligible thermal resistance between the pure and dilute phases, $T_i \approx T_m.$ and the cooling power reduces to

$$\dot{Q}_m\;[\text{W}] = 84\left(\dot{n}_3\;[\text{mol/s}]\right)(T\;[\text{K}])^2.$$

A low T_{m} can only be reached if T_{i} is low. In dilution refrigerators, T_{i} is reduced by using heat exchangers as shown in the schematic diagram of the low-temperature region above. However, at very low temperatures this becomes more and more difficult due to the so-called Kapitza resistance. This is a heat resistance at the surface between the helium liquids and the solid body of the heat exchanger. It is inversely proportional to T^{4} and the heat-exchanging surface area A. In other words: to get the same heat resistance one needs to increase the surface by a factor 10,000 if the temperature reduces by a factor 10. In order to get a low thermal resistance at low temperatures (below about 30 mK), a large surface area is needed. The lower the temperature, the larger the area. In practice, one uses very fine silver powder.

== Limitations ==
There is no fundamental limiting low temperature of dilution refrigerators. Yet the temperature range is limited to about 2 mK for practical reasons. At very low temperatures, both the viscosity and the thermal conductivity of the circulating fluid become larger if the temperature is lowered. To reduce the viscous heating, the diameters of the inlet and outlet tubes of the mixing chamber must go as T^{−3}_{m}, and to get low heat flow the lengths of the tubes should go as T^{−8}_{m}. That means that, to reduce the temperature by a factor 2, one needs to increase the diameter by a factor of 8 and the length by a factor of 256. Hence the volume should be increased by a factor of 2^{14} = 16,384. In other words: every cm^{3} at 2 mK would become 16,384 cm^{3} at 1 mK. The machines would become very big and very expensive. There is a powerful alternative for cooling below 2 mK: nuclear demagnetization refrigeration.

== See also ==
- Low-temperature technology timeline
  - Absolute zero – for the temperature 0 K
- Magnetic refrigeration
- Refrigerated transport Dewar
