= Cryogenic treatment =

Subjecting workpieces to cold temperatures

A cryogenic treatment is the process of treating workpieces to cryogenic temperatures (typically around -300 °F / -184 °C, or as low as −190 °C (−310 °F)) in order to remove residual stresses and improve wear resistance in steels and other metal alloys, such as aluminum. In addition to seeking enhanced stress relief and stabilization, or wear resistance, cryogenic treatment is also sought for its ability to improve corrosion resistance by precipitating micro-fine eta carbides, which can be measured before and after in a part using automated image analysis.

The process has a wide range of applications from industrial tooling to the improvement of musical signal transmission. Some of the benefits of cryogenic treatment include longer part life, less failure due to cracking, improved thermal properties, better electrical properties including less electrical resistance, reduced coefficient of friction, less creep and walk, improved flatness, and easier machining.

== Processes ==
=== Cryogenic tempering ===
Cryogenic tempering is a two-phase metal treatment that involves a descent and ascent phase, including a cryogenic treatment process, known as "cryogenic processing", where the material is slowly cooled to ultra low temperatures, typically around -300 °F / -184 °C, which then optionally reheated slowly, typically up to +325 °F / 162 °C. Materials do not "harden" during the temperature descent or ascent, rather their molecular structures are compressed together tightly in uniformity through a computer controlled process that typically uses liquid nitrogen to slowly descend temperatures.

==== Invention history of cryogenic processing and cryogenic tempering ====
The cryogenic treatment process was invented by Ed Busch (CryoTech) in Detroit, Michigan in 1966, inspired by NASA research, which later merged with 300 Below, Inc. in 2000 to become the world's largest and oldest commercial cryogenic processing company after Peter Paulin of Decatur, IL collaborated with process control engineers to invent the world's first computer-controlled "dry" cryogenic processor in 1992 (where he was featured on the Discovery Channel's Next Step TV Show for his invention).

Whereas the industry initially submerged metal parts in liquid nitrogen by dunking them or pouring liquid nitrogen over the parts, the earliest results proved inconsistent, which led Mr. Paulin to develop 300 Below's "dry" computer-controlled cryogenic processing equipment to ensure consistent and accurate treatment results across every processing run by introducing liquid nitrogen into a chamber above its boiling point, in a "dry" gaseous state, to ensure that parts in a chamber are not thermally shocked by direct exposure to ultracold liquid.

A "dry" cryogenic process does not submerge parts in liquid, but rather ensures that temperatures are slowly descended at less than one degree per minute using short bursts of cold gas being introduced via a solenoid-metered pipe, which is controlled by a computer equipment paired with highly accurate RTD (Resistance Temperature Detector) sensors.

==== Science behind dry cryogenic processing and cryogenic tempering ====
Because all changes to metals take place on the quench, the first phase of the initial descent is called cryogenic processing and by adding a second phase to heat the materials after an initial molecular re-alignment, both processes together are called cryogenic tempering.

By using liquid nitrogen, the temperature can go as low as −196 °C, though, the typical dwell temperature of cryogenic processing equipment is slightly above the boiling point of liquid nitrogen, closer to -300 °F / -184 °C, due to being injected into the processing chamber as a gaseous state and making every attempt not to introduce liquid into the chamber that could cause parts to become thermally shocked.

Cryogenic processing, especially cryogenic tempering, can have a profound effect on the mechanical properties of certain materials, such as steels or tungsten carbide, but the heating phase in cryogenic tempering is typically omitted for softer metals like brass in musical instruments, for piano strings, in certain aerospace applications, or for sensitive electronic components like vacuum tubes and transistors in high-end audio equipment.

In tungsten carbide cobalt (WC-Co), the crystal structure of cobalt transforms from softer FCC to harder HCP phase, whereas the hard tungsten carbide particle is unaffected by the treatment.

==== Applications of cryogenic processing ====
- Aerospace and defense: communication, optical housings, satellites, weapons platforms, guidance systems, landing systems
- Automotive: brake rotors, transmissions, clutches, brake parts, rods, crankshafts, camshafts, axles, bearings, ring and pinion, heads, valve trains, differentials, springs, nuts, bolts, washers
- Cutting tools: cutters, knives, blades, drill bits, end mills, and turning and milling inserts. Cryogenic treatments of cutting tools can be classified as Deep Cryogenic Treatments (around -196 °C) or Shallow Cryogenic Treatments (around -80 °C)
- Forming tools: roll form dies, progressive dies, stamping dies
- Mechanical industry: pumps, motors, nuts, bolts, washers
- Medical: tooling, scalpels
- Motorsports and fleet vehicles: See Automotive for brake rotors and other automotive components.
- Musical: vacuum tubes, audio cables, brass instruments, guitar strings, and fret wire, piano wire, amplifiers, magnetic pickups, cables, connectors
- Sports: firearms, knives, fishing equipment, auto racing, tennis rackets, golf clubs, mountain climbing gear, archery, skiing, aircraft parts, high-pressure lines, bicycles, motorcycles

=== Cryogenic machining ===
Cryogenic machining is a machining process where the traditional flood lubro-cooling liquid, an emulsion of oil in water, is replaced by a jet of either liquid nitrogen (LN2) or pre-compressed carbon dioxide (CO_{2}).

Cryogenic machining is useful in rough machining operations, in order to increase the tool life. It can also be useful to preserve the integrity and quality of the machined surfaces in finish machining operations. Cryogenic machining tests have been performed by researchers for several decades, but the actual commercial applications are still limited to very few companies.

Both cryogenic machining by turning and milling are possible. Cryogenic machining is a relatively new technique in machining. This concept was applied on various machining processes such as turning, milling, drilling, etc. Cryogenic turning technique is generally applied on three major groups of workpiece materials—superalloys, ferrous metals, and viscoelastic polymers/elastomers. The roles of cryogen in machining different materials are unique.

=== Cryogenic rolling ===
Cryogenic rolling or cryorolling, is one of the potential techniques to produce nanostructured bulk materials from its bulk counterpart at cryogenic temperatures. It can be defined as rolling that is carried out at cryogenic temperatures. Nanostructured materials are produced chiefly by severe plastic deformation processes. The majority of these methods require large plastic deformations (strains much larger than unity). In case of cryorolling, the deformation in the strain hardened metals is preserved as a result of the suppression of the dynamic recovery. Hence, large strains can be maintained and after subsequent annealing, ultra-fine-grained structure can be produced.

==== Advantages ====
Comparison of cryorolling and rolling at room temperature:

- In cryorolling, the strain hardening is retained up to the extent to which rolling is carried out. This implies that there will be no dislocation annihilation and dynamic recovery. Where as in rolling at room temperature, dynamic recovery is inevitable and softening takes place.
- The flow stress of the material differs for the sample which is subjected to cryorolling. A cryorolled sample has a higher flow stress compared to a sample subjected to rolling at room temperature.
- Cross slip and climb of dislocations are effectively suppressed during cryorolling leading to high dislocation density which is not the case for room-temperature rolling.
- The corrosion resistance of the cryorolled sample comparatively decreases due to the high residual stress involved.
- The number of electron scattering centres increases for the cryorolled sample and hence the electrical conductivity decreases significantly.
- The cryorolled sample shows a high dissolution rate.
- Ultra-fine-grained structures can be produced from cryorolled samples after subsequent annealing.

== Cryogenic treatment in specific materials ==
=== Stainless steel ===
Torsional and tensional deformation of stainless steel at cryogenic temperature significantly enhances its mechanical strength while incorporating a secondary phase inside the steel. This strength improvement is the result of several phenomena:

- The deformation induced phase transformation into martensitic phase which is stronger body centered cubic phase. The torsional and tensional deformation induces higher volume ratio of martensitic phase near the edge to prevent initial mechanical failure from the surface.
- The torsional deformation creates the gradient phase transformation along the radial direction protecting large hydrostatic tension.
- The high deformation triggers dislocation plasticity in martensitic phase to enhance overall ductility and tensile strength.

=== Copper ===
Zhang et al. exploited the cryorolling to the dynamic plastic deformed copper at liquid nitrogen temperature (LNT-DPD) to greatly enhance tensile strength with high ductility. The key of this combined approach in Cryogenic hardening and Cryogenic rolling is to engineer the nano-sized twin boundary embedded in the copper.

Processing with the plastic deformation of grained bulk metal decreases the size of the grain boundary and enhances the grain boundary strengthening. However, as the grain gets smaller, the interaction between grain and the dislocation inside impedes further process of grains. Among the grain boundaries, it is known that the twin boundaries, a special type of low-energy grain boundary has lower interaction energy with dislocation leading to much smaller saturation size of the grain.

The cryogenic dynamic plastic deformation creates higher fraction of the twin boundaries compared to the severe plastic deformation. Following cryorolling further reduces the grain boundary energy with relieving the twin boundary leading to higher Hall-Petch strengthening effect. In addition, this increases the ability of grain boundary to accommodate more dislocation leading to the improvement in ductility from cryorolling.

=== Titanium ===
Cryogenic hardening of titanium is hard to manipulate compared to other face centered cubic (fcc) metals because these hexagonal close packed (hcp) metals have less symmetry and slip systems to exploit. Recently Zhao et al. introduced the efficient method to manipulate nanotwinned titanium which has higher strength, ductility, and thermal stability.

By cryoforging repetitively along the three principal axes in liquid nitrogen and following annealing process, pure titanium can possess hierarchical twin boundary network structure which suppresses the motion of dislocation and significantly enhances its mechanical property. The microstructure analysis found that the repeated twinning and de-twinning keep increasing the fraction of nanosized twin boundaries and refining the grains to render much higher Hall-Petch strengthening effect even after the saturation of microscale twin boundary at high flow stress. Especially, the strength and ductility of nanotwinned titanium at 77 K / -196.15 °C, reaches about 2 GPa and ~100%, which far outweighs those of conventional cryogenic steels even without any inclusion of alloying.
