= Cryogenic hardening =

Cryogenic hardening is a cryogenic treatment process where the material is cooled to approximately −185 °C (−301 °F), typically using liquid nitrogen. It can have a profound effect on the mechanical properties of certain steels, provided their composition and prior heat treatment are such that they retain some austenite at room temperature. It is designed to increase the amount of martensite in the steel's crystal structure, increasing its strength and hardness, sometimes at the cost of toughness. Presently this treatment is being used on tool steels, high-carbon, high-chromium steels and in some cases to cemented carbide to obtain excellent wear resistance. Recent research shows that there is precipitation of fine carbides (eta carbides) in the matrix during this treatment which imparts very high wear resistance to the steels.

The transformation from austenite to martensite is mostly accomplished through quenching, but in general it is driven further and further toward completion as temperature decreases. In higher-alloy steels such as austenitic stainless steel, the onset of transformation can require temperatures much lower than room temperature. More commonly, an incomplete transformation occurs in the initial quench, so that cryogenic treatments merely enhance the effects of prior quenching. However, since martensite is a non-equilibrium phase on the iron-iron carbide phase diagram, it has not been shown that warming the part after the cryogenic treatment results in the re-transformation of the induced martensite back to austenite or to ferrite plus cementite, negating the hardening effect.

The transformation between these phases is instantaneous and not dependent upon diffusion, and also that this treatment causes more complete hardening rather than moderating extreme hardness, both of which make the term "cryogenic tempering" technically incorrect.

Hardening need not be due to martensitic transformation, but can also be accomplished by cold work at cryogenic temperatures. The defects introduced by plastic deformation at these low temperatures are often quite different from the dislocations that usually form at room temperature, and produce materials changes which in some ways resemble the effects of shock hardening. While this process is more effective than traditional cold work, it serves mainly as a theoretical test bed for more economical processes such as explosive forging.

Many alloys that do not undergo martensitic transformation have been subjected to the same treatments as steels—that is, cooled with no provisions for cold work. If any benefit is seen from such a process, one plausible explanation is that thermal expansion causes minor, but permanent deformation of the material.

== See also ==
- Cryogenic cold-forming, possible with austenitic stainless steels where ductility is maintained at cryogenic temperatures
- Cryogenic treatment
