= Shock hardening =

Material strengthening process

Shock hardening is a process used to strengthen metals and alloys, wherein a shock wave produces atomic-scale defects in the material's crystalline structure. As in cold work, these defects interfere with the normal processes by which metallic materials yield (plasticity), making materials stiffer, but more brittle. When compared to traditional cold work, such an extremely rapid process results in a different class of defect, producing a much harder material for a given change in shape. If the shock wave applies too great a force for too long, however, the rarefaction front that follows it can form voids in the material due to hydrostatic tension, weakening the material and often causing it to spall. Since voids nucleate at large defects, such as oxide inclusions and grain boundaries, high-purity samples with a large grain size (especially single crystals) are able to withstand greater shock without spalling, and can therefore be made much harder.

Shock hardening has been observed in many contexts:

Explosive forging uses the detonation of a high explosive charge to create a shockwave. This effect is used to harden rail track cast components and, coupled with the Misnay-Schardin effect, in the operation of explosively forged penetrators. Greater hardening can be achieved by using a lower quantity of an explosive with greater brisance, so that the force applied is greater but the material spends less time in hydrostatic tension.

Laser shock, similar to inertial confinement fusion, uses the ablation plume caused by a laser pulse to apply force to the laser's target. The rebound from the expelled matter can create very high pressures, and the pulse length of lasers is often quite short, meaning that good hardening can be achieved with little risk of spallation. Surface effects can also be achieved by laser treatment, including amorphization.

Light-gas guns have been used to study shock hardening. Although too labor-intensive for widespread industrial application, they do provide a versatile research testbed. They allow precise control of both magnitude and profile of the shock wave through adjustments to the projectile's muzzle velocity and density profile, respectively. Studies of various projectile types have been crucial in overturning a prior theory that spallation occurs at a threshold of pressure, independent of time. Instead, experiments show longer-lasting shocks of a given magnitude produce more material damage.

== See also ==
- List of laser articles
