= Pulse tube refrigerator =

Device using sound waves to reduce heat

The pulse tube refrigerator (PTR) or pulse tube cryocooler is a developing technology that emerged largely in the early 1980s with a series of other innovations in the broader field of thermoacoustics. In contrast with other cryocoolers (e.g. Stirling cryocooler and GM-refrigerators), this cryocooler can be made without moving parts in the low temperature part of the device, making the cooler suitable for a wide variety of applications.

== Uses ==
Pulse tube cryocoolers are used in niche industrial applications such as semiconductor fabrication and superconducting radio-frequency circuits. They are also used in military applications such as for the cooling of infrared sensors.

In research, PTRs are often used as precoolers of dilution refrigerators. They are also being developed for cooling of astronomical detectors where liquid cryogens are typically used, such as the Atacama Cosmology Telescope or the Qubic experiment (an interferometer for cosmology studies). Pulse tubes are particularly useful in space-based telescopes such as the James Webb Space Telescope where it is not possible to replenish the cryogens as they are depleted. It has also been suggested that pulse tubes could be used to liquefy oxygen on Mars.

== Principle of operation ==
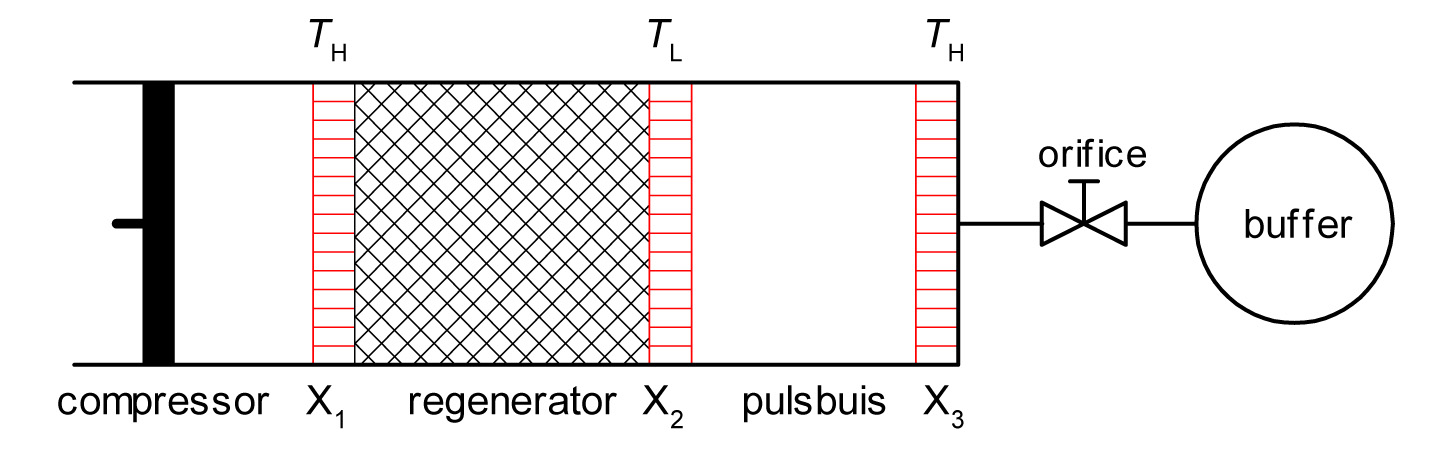
Figure 1: Schematic drawing of a Stirling-type single-orifice PTR. From left to right: a compressor, a heat exchanger (X_{1}), a regenerator, a heat exchanger (X_{2}), a tube (often called the pulse tube), a heat exchanger (X_{3}), a flow resistance (orifice), and a buffer volume. The cooling is generated at the low temperature T_{L}. Room temperature is T_{H}.

Figure 1 represents the Stirling-type single-orifice pulse-tube refrigerator (PTR), which is filled with a gas, typically helium at a pressure varying from 10 to 30 bar. From left to right the components are:

- a compressor, with a piston moving back and forth at room temperature T_{H}
- a heat exchanger X_{1} where heat is released to the surroundings at room temperature
- a regenerator consisting of a porous medium with a large specific heat (which can be stainless steel wire mesh, copper wire mesh, phosphor bronze wire mesh, lead balls, lead shot, or rare earth materials) in which the gas flows back and forth
- a heat exchanger X_{2}, cooled by the gas, where the useful cooling power $\dot{Q}_\text{L}$ is delivered at the low temperature T_{L}, taken from the object to be cooled
- a tube in which the gas is pushed and pulled
- a heat exchanger X_{3} near room temperature where heat is released to the surroundings
- a flow resistance (often called orifice)
- a buffer volume (a large closed volume at practically constant pressure)

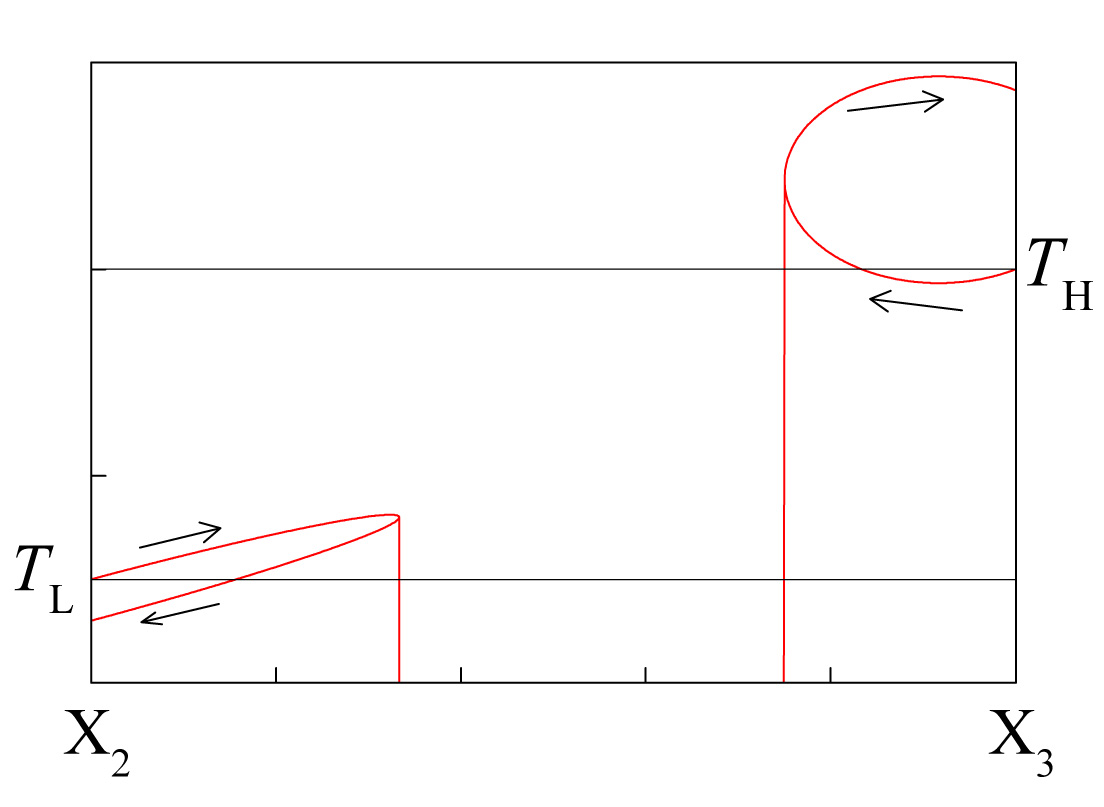
Figure 2: Left: (near X_{2}): a gas element enters the tube with temperature T_{L} and leaves it with a lower temperature. Right: (near X_{3}): a gas element enters the tube with temperature T_{H} and leaves it with a higher temperature.

The part in between X_{1} and X_{3} is thermally insulated from the surroundings, usually by vacuum. The pressure varies gradually and the velocities of the gas are low. So the name "pulse" tube cooler is misleading, since there are no pulses in the system.

The piston moves periodically from left to right and back. As a result, the gas also moves from left to right and back while the pressure within the system increases and decreases. If the gas from the compressor space moves to the right, it enters the regenerator with temperature T_{H} and leaves the regenerator at the cold end with temperature T_{L}, hence heat is transferred into the regenerator material. On its return, the heat stored within the regenerator is transferred back into the gas.

In the tube, the gas is thermally isolated (adiabatic), so the temperature of the gas in the tube varies with the pressure.

At the cold end of the tube, the gas enters the tube via X_{2} when the pressure is high with temperature T_{L} and returns when the pressure is low with a temperature below T_{L}, hence taking up heat from X_{2}: this gives the desired cooling effect at X_{2}.

To understand why the low-pressure gas returns at a lower temperature, look at figure 1 and consider gas molecules close to X_{3} (at the hot end), which move in and out of the tube through the orifice. Molecules flow into the tube (to the left) when the pressure in the tube is low (it is sucked into the tube via X_{3}, coming from the orifice and the buffer). Upon entering the tube, it has the temperature T_{H}. Later in the cycle, the same mass of gas is pushed out from the tube again when the pressure inside the tube is high. As a consequence, its temperature will be higher than T_{H}. In the heat exchanger X_{3}, it releases heat and cools down to the ambient temperature T_{H}.

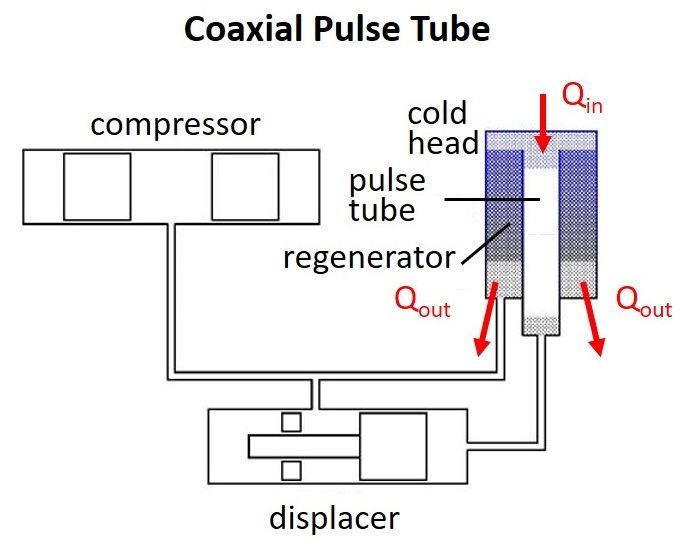
Figure 3: Coaxial pulse tube with a displacer

Figure 3 shows a coaxial pulse tube, which is a more useful configuration in which the regenerator surrounds the central pulse tube. This is compact and places the cold head at an end, so it is easy to integrate with whatever is to be cooled. The displacer can be passively driven, and this recovers work that would otherwise be dissipated in the orifice.

== Performance ==
The performance of the cooler is determined mainly by the quality of the regenerator. It has to satisfy conflicting requirements: it must have a low flow resistance (so it must be short with wide channels), but the heat exchange should also be good (so it must be long with narrow channels). The material must have a large heat capacity. At temperatures above 50 K practically all materials are suitable. Bronze or stainless steel is often used. For temperatures between 10 and 50 K lead is most suitable. Below 10 K one uses magnetic materials which are specially developed for this application.

The so-called coefficient of performance (COP; denoted $\xi$) of coolers is defined as the ratio between the cooling power $\dot{Q}_\text{L}$ and the compressor power P. In formula: $\xi = \dot{Q}_\text{L}/P$. For a perfectly reversible cooler, $\xi$ is given by Carnot's theorem:

$\xi_\text{C} = \frac{T_\text{L}}{T_\text{H} - T_\text{L}}$	1

However, a pulse-tube refrigerator is not perfectly reversible due to the presence of the orifice, which has flow resistance. Instead, the COP of an ideal PTR is given by

$\xi_\text{PTR} = \frac{T_\text{L}}{T_\text{H}}$	2

which is lower than that of ideal coolers.

== Comparison with other coolers ==
In most coolers gas is compressed and expanded periodically. Well-known coolers such as the Stirling engine coolers and the popular Gifford-McMahon coolers have a displacer that ensures that the cooling (due to expansion) takes place in a different region of the machine than the heating (due to compression). Due to its clever design, the PTR does not have such a displacer, making the construction of a PTR simpler, cheaper, and more reliable. Furthermore, there are no mechanical vibrations and no electro-magnetic interferences. The basic operation of cryocoolers and related thermal machines is described by De Waele

== History ==
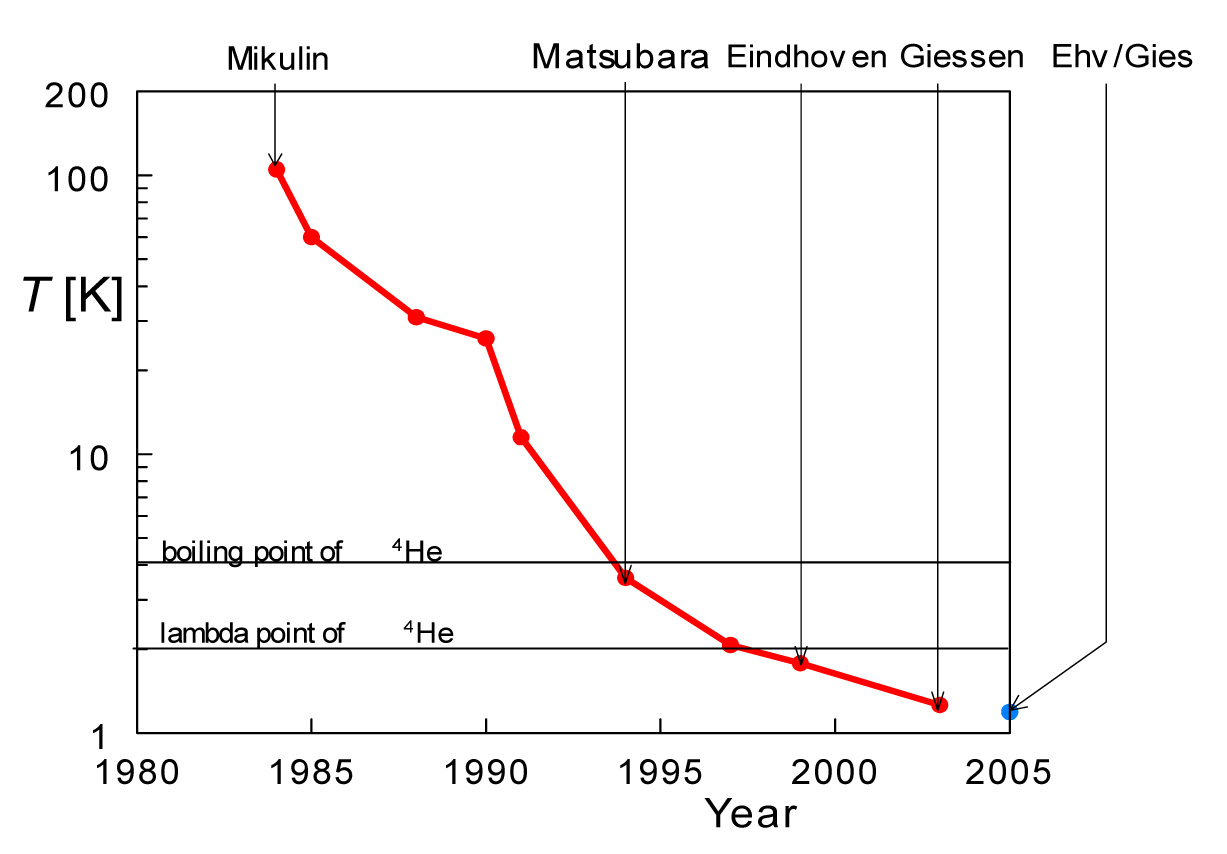
Figure 4: The temperature of PTRs over the years. The temperature of 1.2 K was reached in a collaboration between the groups of Giessen and Eindhoven. They used a superfluid vortex cooler as an additional cooling stage to the PTR.

W. E. Gifford and R. C. Longsworth, in the 1960s, invented the so-called Basic Pulse Tube Refrigerator. The modern PTR was invented in 1984 by Mikulin who introduced an orifice to the basic pulse tube. He reached a temperature of 105 K. Soon after that, PTRs became better due to the invention of new variations. This is shown in figure 4, where the lowest temperature for PTRs is plotted as a function of time.

At the moment, the lowest temperature is below the boiling point of helium (4.2 K). Originally this was considered to be impossible. For some time it looked as if it would be impossible to cool below the lambda point of ^{4}He (2.17 K), but the low-temperature group of the Eindhoven University of Technology managed to cool to a temperature of 1.73 K by replacing the usual ^{4}He as refrigerant by its rare isotope ^{3}He. Later this record was broken by the Giessen Group that managed to get even below 1.3 K. In a collaboration between the groups from Giessen and Eindhoven a temperature of 1.2 K was reached by combining a PTR with a superfluid vortex cooler.

== Types ==
For cooling, the source of the pressure variations is unimportant. PTRs for temperatures below 20 K usually operate at frequencies of 1 to 2 Hz and with pressure variations from 10 to 25 bar. The swept volume of the compressor would be very high (up to one liter and more). Therefore, the compressor is uncoupled from the cooler. A system of valves (usually a rotating valve) alternately connects the high-pressure and the low-pressure side of the compressor to the hot end of the regenerator. As the high-temperature part of this type of PTR is the same as of GM-coolers, this type of PTR is called a GM-type PTR. The gas flows through the valves are accompanied by losses which are absent in the Stirling-type PTR.

PTRs can be classified according to their shape. If the regenerator and the tube are in line (as in fig. 1) we talk about a linear PTR. The disadvantage of the linear PTR is that the cold spot is in the middle of the cooler. For many applications it is preferable that the cooling is produced at the end of the cooler. By bending the PTR we get a U-shaped cooler. Both hot ends can be mounted on the flange of the vacuum chamber at room temperature. This is the most common shape of PTRs. For some applications it is preferable to have a cylindrical geometry. In that case the PTR can be constructed in a coaxial way so that the regenerator becomes a ring-shaped space surrounding the tube.

The lowest temperature reached with single-stage PTRs is just above 10 K. However, one PTR can be used to precool the other. The hot end of the second tube is connected to room temperature and not to the cold end of the first stage. In this clever way it is avoided that the heat, released at the hot end of the second tube, is a load on the first stage. In applications the first stage also operates as a temperature-anchoring platform for e.g. shield cooling of superconducting-magnet cryostats. Matsubara and Gao were the first to cool below 4 K with a three-stage PTR. With two-stage PTRs temperatures of 2.1 K, so just above the λ-point of helium, have been obtained. With a three-stage PTR 1.73 K has been reached using ^{3}He as the working fluid.

== Prospects ==
The coefficient of performance of PTRs at room temperature is low, so it is not likely that they will play a role in domestic cooling. However, below about 80 K the coefficient of performance is comparable with other coolers (compare equations (1) and (2)) and in the low-temperature region the advantages get the upper hand. PTRs are commercially available for temperatures in the region of 70 K and 4 K. They are applied in infrared detection systems, for reduction of thermal noise in devices based on (high-T_{c}) superconductivity such as SQUIDs, and filters for telecommunication. PTRs are also suitable for cooling MRI-systems and energy-related systems using superconducting magnets. In so-called dry magnets, coolers are used so that no cryoliquid is needed at all or for the recondensation of the evaporated helium. Also the combination of cryocoolers with ^{3}He-^{4}He dilution refrigerators for the temperature region down to 2 mK is attractive since in this way the whole temperature range from room temperature to 2 mK is easier to access.

For many low temperature experiments, mechanical vibrations caused by PTRs can cause microphonics on measurement lines, which is a big disadvantage of PTRs. Particularly for scanning probe microscopy uses, PTR-based scanning tunneling microscopes (STMs) have historically difficult due to the extreme vibration sensitivity of STM. Use of an exchange gas above the vibration sensitive scanning head enabled the first PTR based low temperature STMs. Now, there are commercially available PTR-based, cryogen free scanning probe systems.

== See also ==
- Cryocooler
- Regenerative cooling
- Timeline of low-temperature technology
