= Cryocooler =

Refrigeration system that cools to below 120 K

A cryocooler is a refrigerator designed to reach cryogenic temperatures (below 120 K, -153 °C, -243.7 °F). The term is most often used for smaller systems, typically table-top size, with input powers less than about 20 kW. Some can have input powers as low as 2–3 W. Large systems, such as those used for cooling the superconducting magnets in particle accelerators are more often called cryogenic refrigerators. Their input powers can be as high as 1 MW. In most cases cryocoolers use a cryogenic fluid as the working substance and employ moving parts to cycle the fluid around a thermodynamic cycle. The fluid is typically compressed at room temperature, precooled in a heat exchanger, then expanded at some low temperature. The returning low-pressure fluid passes through the heat exchanger to precool the high-pressure fluid before entering the compressor intake. The cycle is then repeated.

== Ideal heat exchangers and regenerators ==
Heat exchangers are important components of all cryocoolers. Ideal heat exchangers have no flow resistance and the exit gas temperature is the same as the (fixed) body temperature T_{X} of the heat exchanger. Note that even a perfect heat exchanger will not affect the entrance temperature T_{i} of the gas. This leads to losses.

An important component of refrigerators, operating with oscillatory flows, is the regenerator. A regenerator consists of a matrix of a solid porous material, such as granular particles or metal sieves, through which gas flows back and forth. Periodically heat is stored and released by the material. The thermal contact with the gas must be good and the flow resistance of the matrix must be low. These are conflicting requirements. The thermodynamic and hydrodynamic properties of regenerators are complicated, so one usually makes simplifying models. In its most extreme form an ideal regenerator has the following properties:

- large volumetric heat capacity of the material;
- perfect heat contact between gas and matrix;
- zero flow resistance of the matrix;
- zero porosity (this is the volume fraction of the gas);
- zero thermal conductivity in the flow direction;
- the gas is ideal.

Progress in the cryocooler field in recent decades is in large part due to development of new materials having high heat capacity below 10 K.

== Stirling refrigerators ==
=== Components ===
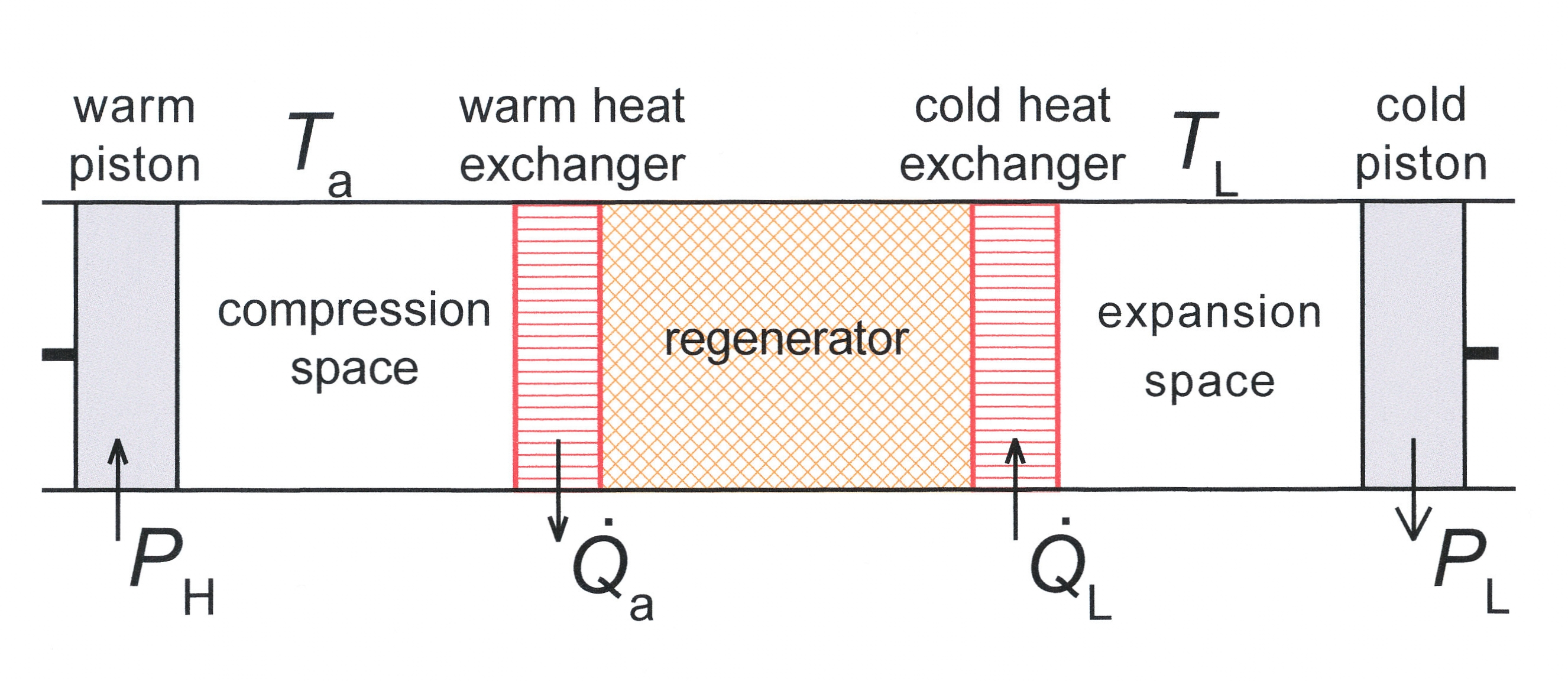
Fig.1 Schematic diagram of a Stirling cooler. The system has one piston at ambient temperature T_{a} and one piston at low temperature T_{L}.

The basic type of Stirling-type cooler is depicted in Fig.1. It consists of (from left to right):

- a piston
- a compression space and heat exchanger (all at ambient temperature T_{a})
- a regenerator
- a heat exchanger
- an expansion space
- a piston (all at the low temperature T_{L}).

Left and right the thermal contact with the surroundings at the temperatures T_{a} and T_{L} is supposed to be perfect so that the compression and expansion are isothermal. The work, performed during the expansion, is used to reduce the total input power. Usually helium is the working fluid.

=== Cooling cycle ===
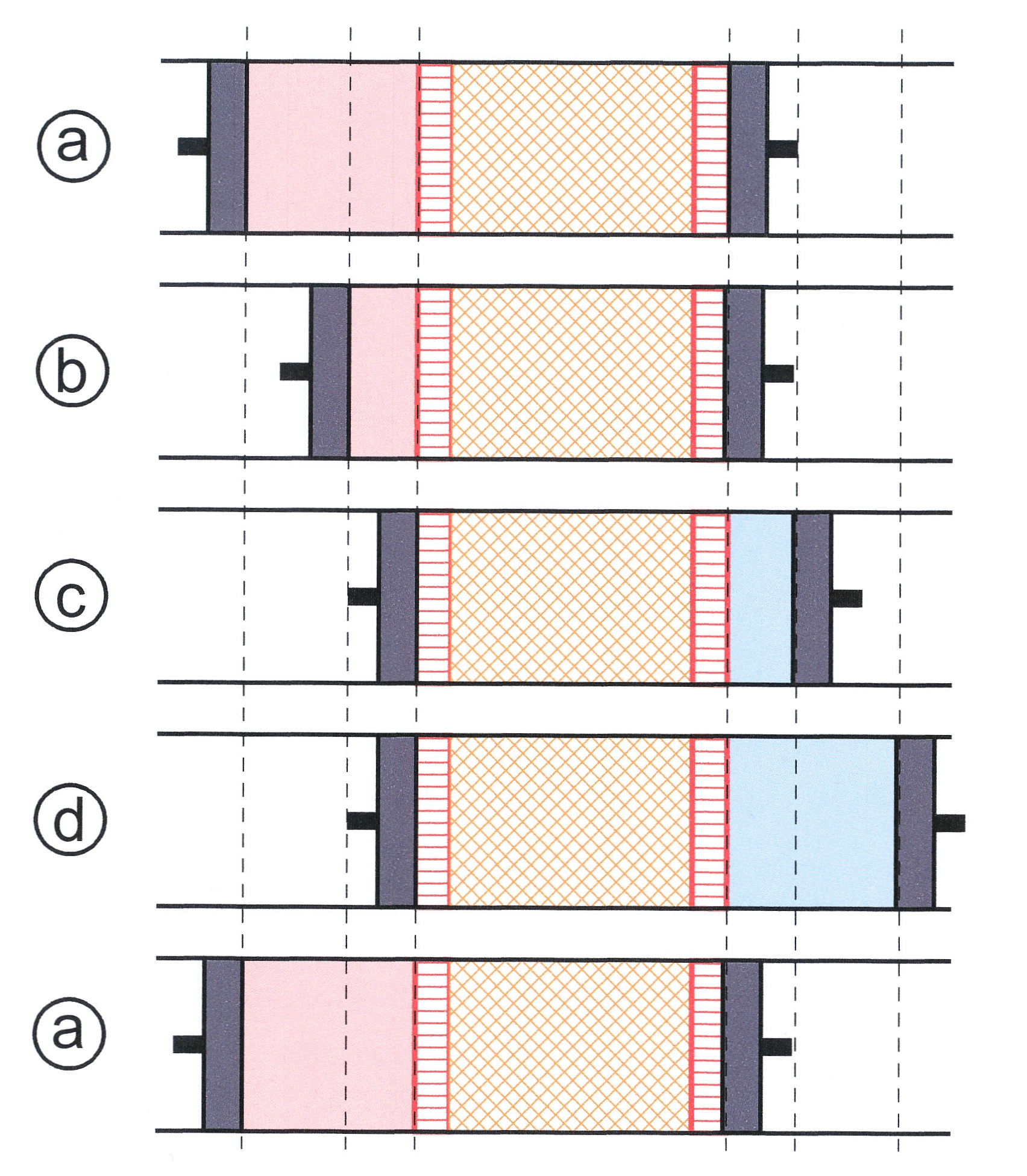
Fig.2 Four states in the Stirling cycle.

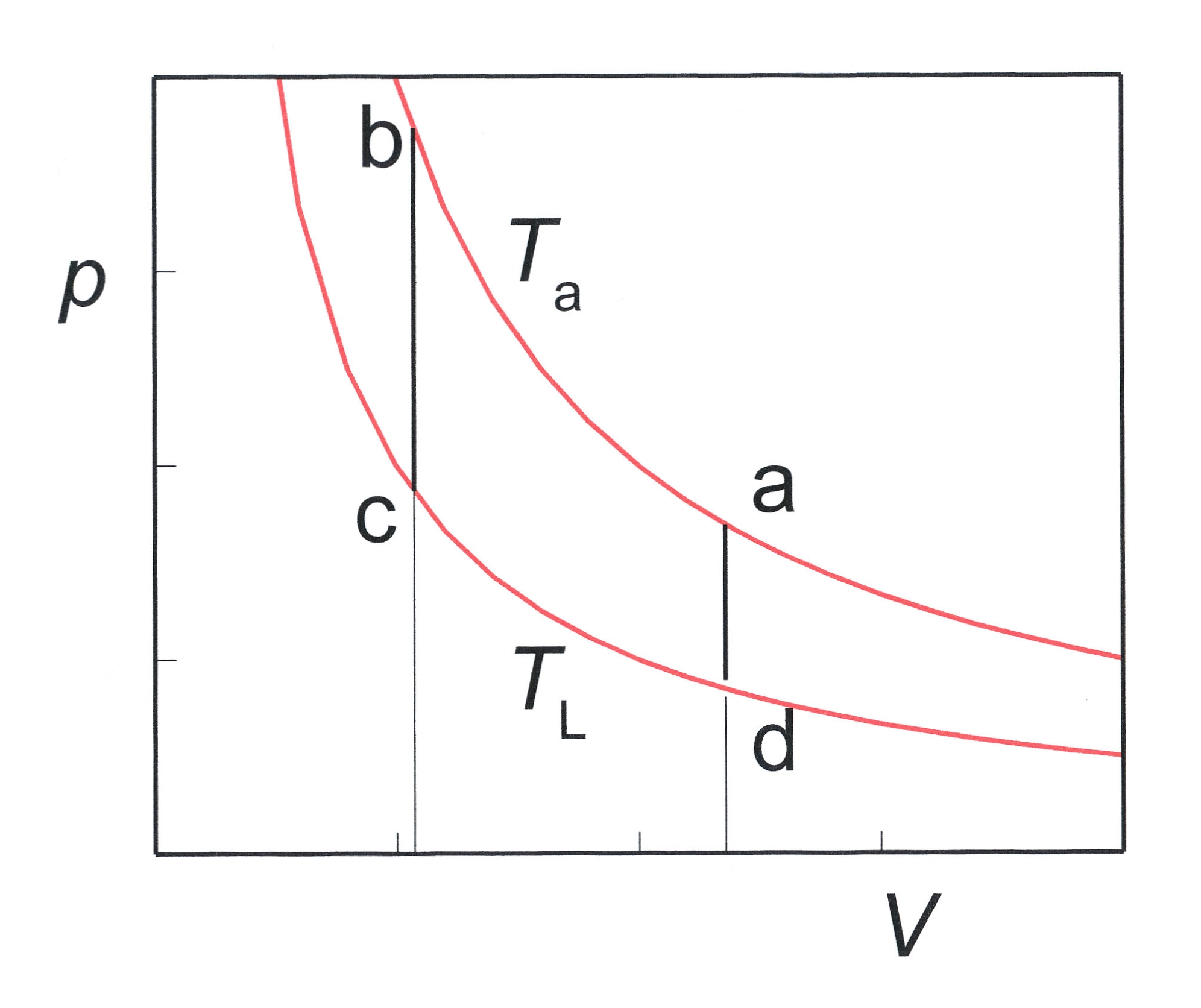
Fig.3 pV-diagram of the ideal Stirling cycle.

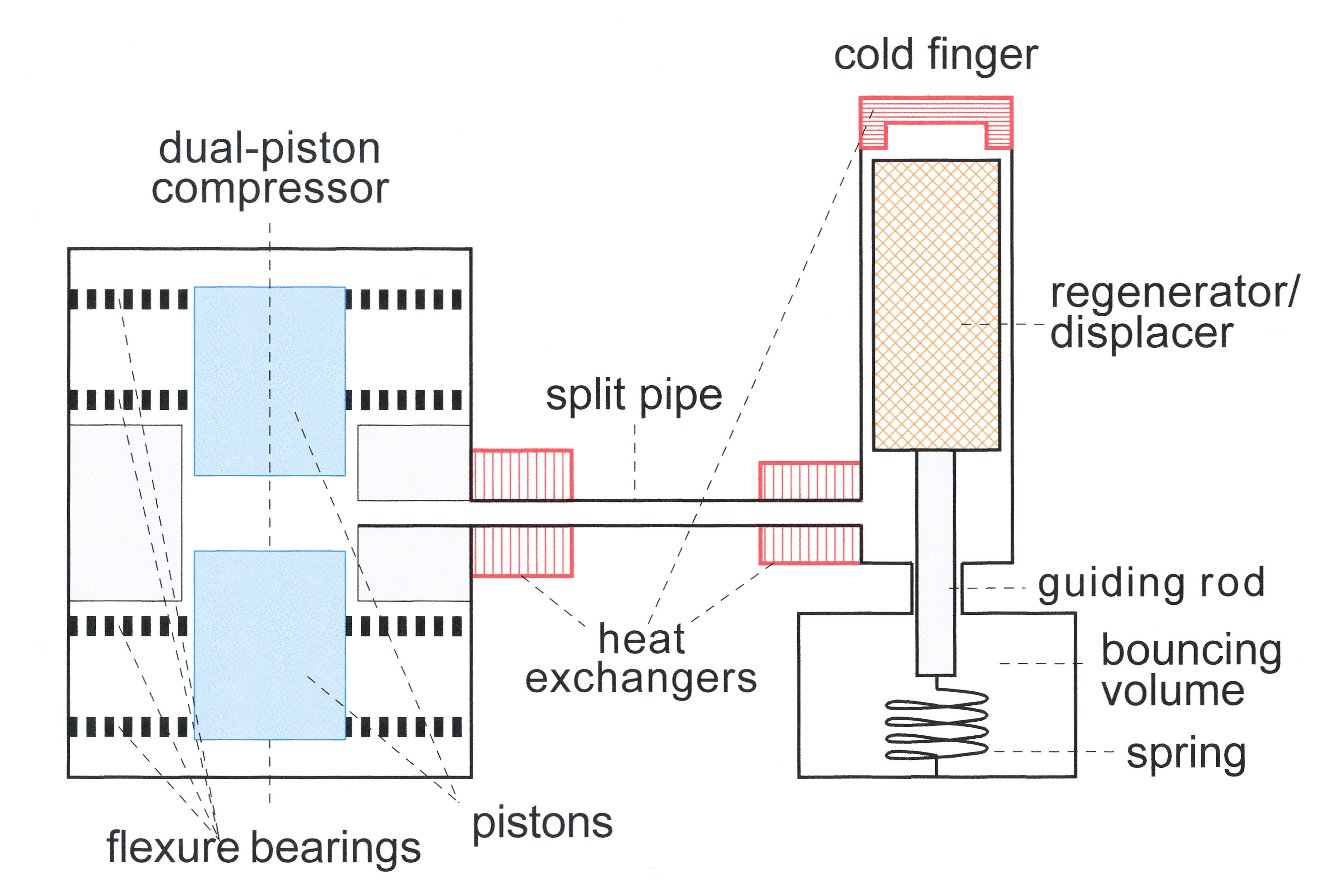
Fig.4 Schematic diagram of a split-pair Stirling refrigerator. The cooling power is supplied to the heat exchanger of the cold finger. Usually the heat flows are so small that there is no need for physical heat exchangers around the split pipe.

The cooling cycle is split in 4 steps as depicted in Fig.2. The cycle starts when the two pistons are in their most left positions:

- From a to b, the warm piston moves to the right while the cold piston is fixed. The temperature of compressed gas at the hot end is isothermal (by definition), so heat Q_{a} is given off to the surroundings at ambient temperature T_{a}.
- From b to c, the two pistons move to the right. The volume between the two pistons is kept constant. The hot gas enters the regenerator with temperature T_{a} and leaves it with temperature T_{L}. The gas gives off heat to the regenerator material.
- From c to d, the cold piston moves to the right while the warm piston is fixed. The expansion is isothermal and heat Q_{L} is taken up. This is the useful cooling power.
- From d to a, the two pistons move to the left while the total volume remains constant. The gas enters the regenerator with low temperature T_{L} and leaves it with high temperature T_{a} so heat is taken up from the regenerator material. At the end of this step the state of the cooler is the same as in the beginning.

In the pV diagram (Fig.3) the corresponding cycle consists of two isotherms and two isochores. The volume V is the volume between the two pistons. In practice the cycle is not divided in discrete steps as described above. Usually the motions of both pistons are driven by a common rotary axes which makes the motions harmonic. The phase difference between the motions of the two pistons is about 90°. In the ideal case the cycle is reversible so the COP (the ratio of the cooling power and the input power) is equal to the Carnot COP given by T_{L}/(T_{a} − T_{L}).

It is not so practical to have a cold piston, as described above, so, in many cases, a displacer is used instead of the cold piston. A displacer is a solid body which moves back and forth in the cold head driving the gas back and forth between the warm and the cold end of the cold head via the regenerator. No work is required to move the displacer since, ideally there is no pressure drop over it. Typically its motion is 90 degrees out of phase with the piston. In the ideal case the COP also equals to the Carnot COP.

Another type of Stirling cooler is the split-pair type (Fig.4), consisting of a compressor, a split pipe, and a cold finger. Usually there are two pistons moving in opposite directions driven by AC magnetic fields (as in loudspeakers). The pistons can be suspended by so-called flexure bearings. They provide stiffness in the radial direction and flexibility in the axial direction. The pistons and the compressor casing do not touch so no lubricants are needed and there is no wear. The regenerator in the cold finger is suspended by a spring. The cooler operates at a frequency near the resonance frequency of the mass-spring system of the cold finger.

== Gifford-McMahon refrigerators ==
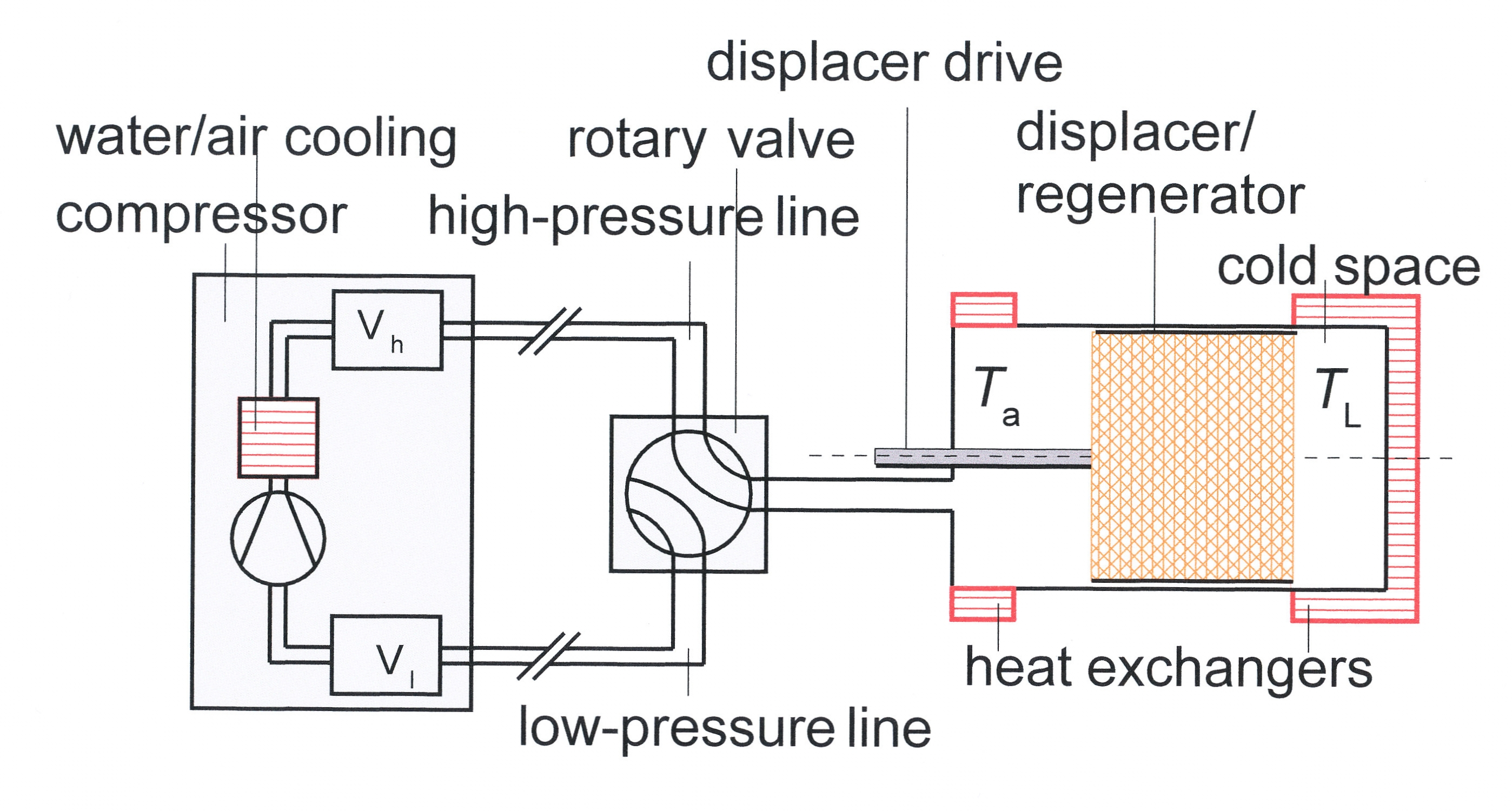
Fig.5 Schematic diagram of a GM-cooler. V_{l} and V_{h} are buffer volumes of the compressor. The compression heat is removed by the cooling water of the compressor via a heat exchanger. The rotary valves alternatingly connect the cooler to the high- and the low-pressure sides of the compressor and runs synchronous with the displacer.

Gifford-McMahon (GM) coolers have found widespread application in many low-temperature systems e.g. in MRI and cryopumps. Fig.5 is a schematic diagram. Helium at pressures in the 10–30 bars (150–440 psi) range is the working fluid. The cold head contains a compression and expansion space, a regenerator, and a displacer. Usually the regenerator and the displacer are combined in one body. The pressure variations in the cold head are obtained by connecting it periodically to the high- and low-pressure sides of a compressor by a rotating valve. Its position is synchronized with the motion of the displacer. During the opening and closing of the valves irreversible processes take place, so GM-coolers have intrinsic losses. This is a clear disadvantage of this type of cooler. The advantage is that the cycle frequencies of the compressor and the displacer are uncoupled so that the compressor can run at power-line frequency (50 or 60 Hz) while the cycle of the cold head is 1 Hz. In this way the swept volume of the compressor can be 50 or 60 times smaller than of the cooler. Basic (cheap) compressors of domestic refrigerators can be used, but one must prevent overheating of the compressor as it is not designed for helium. One must also prevent oil vapor from entering the regenerator by high-quality purification traps.

=== Cooling cycle ===
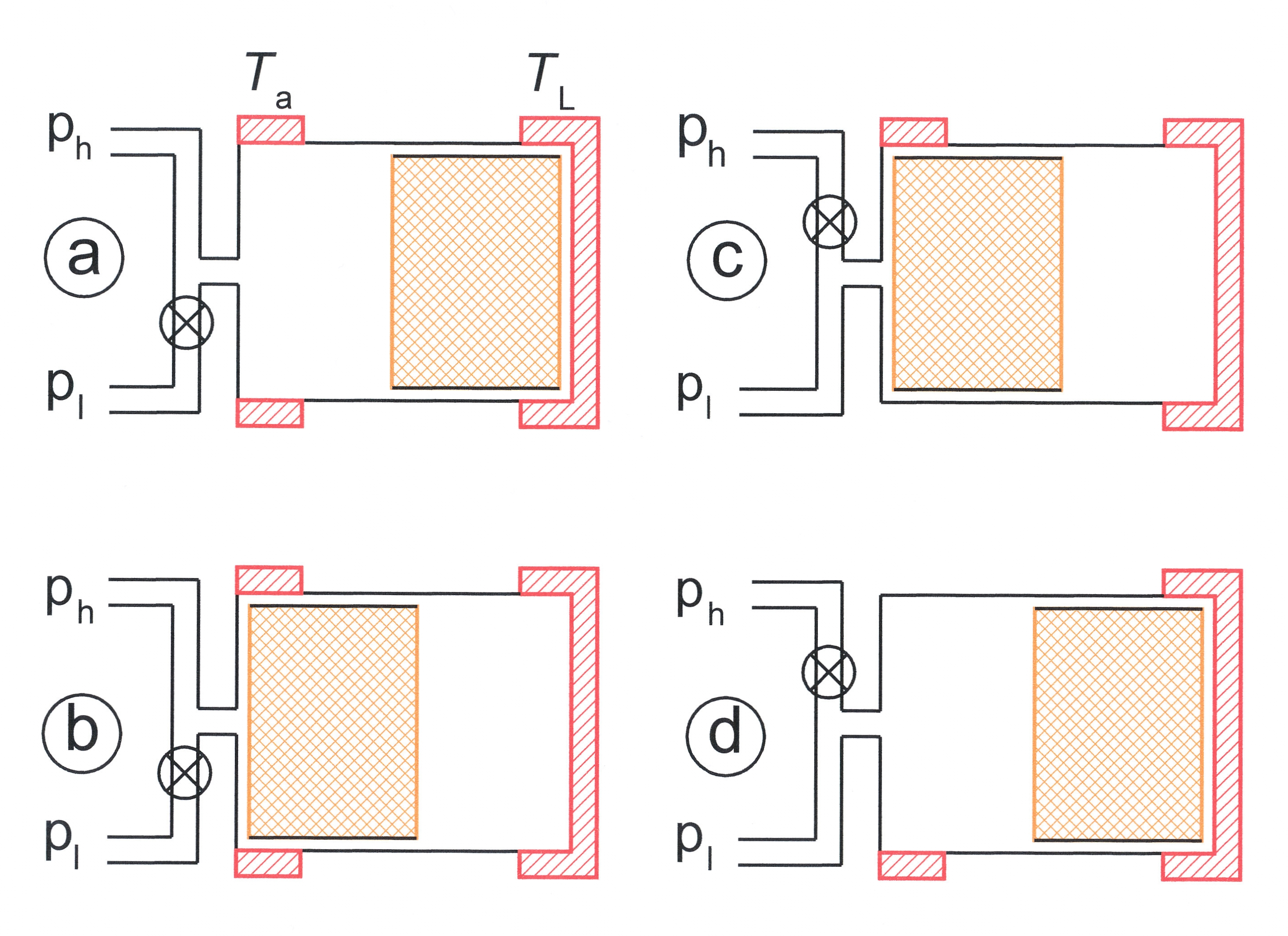
Fig. 6 The four stages in the cooling cycle of the GM cooler.

The cycle can be divided in four steps, with Fig.6, as follows:

The cycle starts with the low-pressure (LP) valve closed, the high-pressure (HP) valve open, and the displacer all the way to the right (so in the cold region). All the gas is at room temperature.

- From a to b. The displacer moves to the left while the cold head is connected to the HP side of the compressor. The gas passes the regenerator entering the regenerator at ambient temperature T_{a} and leaving it with temperature T_{L}. Heat is released by the gas to the regenerator material.
- From b to c. The HP valve is closed and the LP valve opened with fixed position of the displacer. Part of the gas flows through the regenerator to the LP side of the compressor. The gas expands. The expansion is isothermal so heat is taken up from the application. This is where the useful cooling power is produced.
- From c to d. The displacer moves to the right with the cold head connected to the LP side of the compressor forcing the cold gas to pass the regenerator, while taking up heat from the regenerator.
- From d to a. The LP valve is closed and the HP valve opened with fixed position of the displacer. The gas, now in the hot end of the cold head, is compressed and heat is released to the surroundings. In the end of this step we are back in position a.

== Pulse-tube refrigerators ==
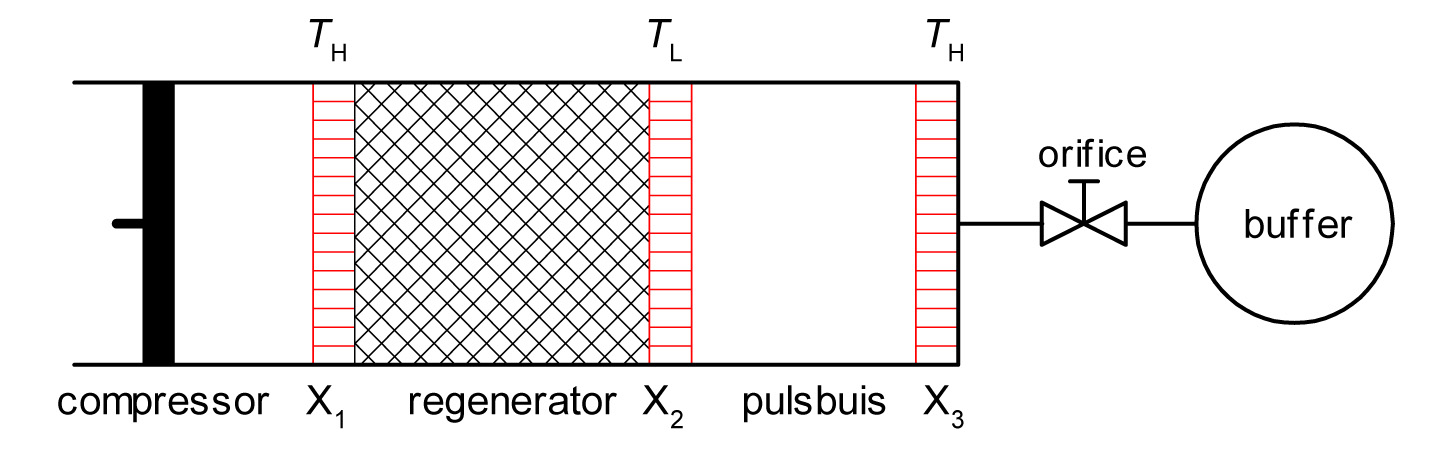
Fig.7 Schematic diagram of a Stirling-type single-orifice PTR.

A so-called Stirling-type single-orifice PTR is represented schematically in Fig.7. From left to right it consists of: a piston which moves back and forth; a heat exchanger X_{1} (after cooler) where heat is released at room temperature (T_{a}) to the environment; a regenerator; a heat exchanger X_{L} at low temperature (T_{L}) where heat is absorbed from the application; a tube, often called the pulse tube; a heat exchanger X_{3} to room temperature (T_{a}); a flow resistance (orifice); a buffer volume, in which the pressure p_{B} is practically constant.

== Joule-Thomson cooler ==
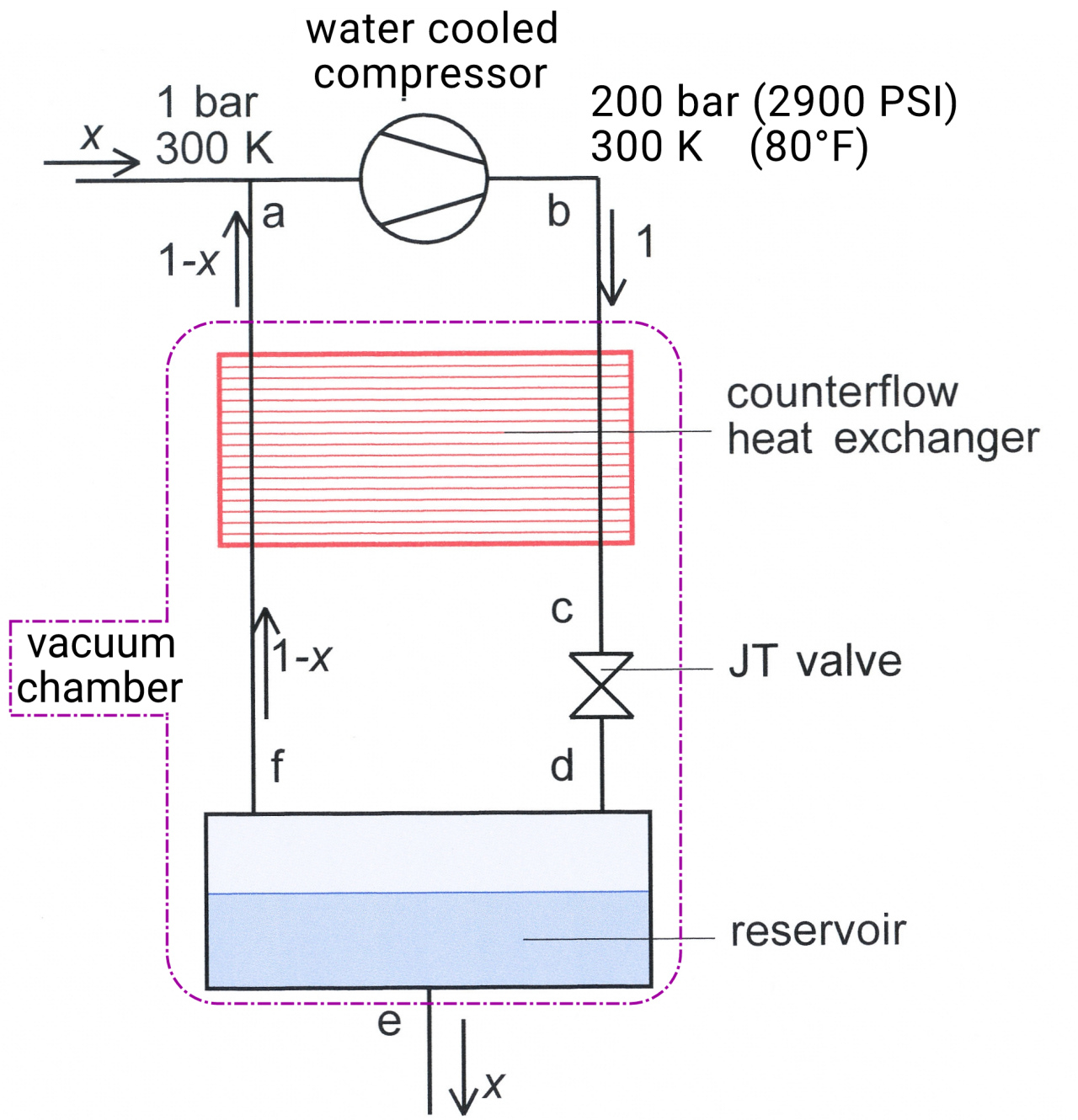
Fig. 8 Schematic diagram of a JT liquefier. A fraction x of the compressed gas is removed as liquid. At room temperature it is supplied as gas at 1 bar, so that the system is in the steady state.

The Joule-Thomson (JT) cooler was invented by Carl von Linde and William Hampson so it is also called the Linde-Hampson cooler. It is a simple type of cooler which is widely applied as cryocooler or as the (final stage) of coolants. It can easily be miniaturized, but it is also used on a very large scale in the liquefaction of natural gas. Joule-Thomson coolers do not emit heat nor vibrations at the cold-end. The compressor, which does emit heat and vibrations, can be located far from the cold-end, so it does not interfere with the cold-end functionality. This benefit can be increased by connecting the compressor and cold-end with flexible tubing. A schematic diagram of a JT liquefier is given in Fig.8. It consists of a compressor, a counterflow heat exchanger, a JT valve, and a reservoir. The compressor can be either oil lubricated of oil-free, water- or air- cooled.

=== Cooling cycle ===
In Fig.8 the pressures and temperatures refer to the case of a nitrogen liquefier. At the inlet of the compressor the gas is at room temperature (300 K) and a pressure of 1 bar (point a). The compression heat is removed by cooling water. After compression the gas temperature is ambient temperature (300 K) and the pressure is 200 bars (2,900 psi) (point b). Next it enters the warm (high-pressure) side of the counterflow heat exchanger where it is precooled. It leaves the exchanger at point c. After the JT expansion, point d, it has a temperature of 77.36 K (−195.79 °C; −320.42 °F) and a pressure of 1 bar. The liquid fraction is x. The liquid leaves the system at the bottom of the reservoir (point e) and the gas (fraction 1 − x) flows into the cold (low-pressure) side of the counterflow heat exchanger (point f). It leaves the heat exchanger at room temperature (point a). In order to keep the system in the steady state, gas is supplied to compensate for the liquid fraction x that has been removed.

When used as a cryocooler it is preferable to use gas mixtures instead of pure nitrogen. In this way the efficiency is improved and the high pressure is much lower than 200 bar, normally between 20 and 40 bar. Mixed refrigerants are designed according to different requirements: cooling temperature, flammability, environmental aspects, and compressor's compatibility.

A more detailed description of Joule-Thomson coolers and Joule-Thomson refrigerators can be found in.

== Applications ==
Cryocoolers are a key enabling technology for applications infrared detection and applied superconductivity. Applications include superconducting electronics and quantum computing. Compact cryocoolers have been developed for superconducting photon detectors.

== See also ==
- Cryogenic processor
- Adiabatic demagnetization refrigerator
- Dilution refrigerator
- Hampson-Linde cycle
- Pulse tube refrigerator
- Stirling engine (Stirling cryocooler)
- Entropy production
