= Cryogenics =

Study of the production and behaviour of materials at very low temperatures

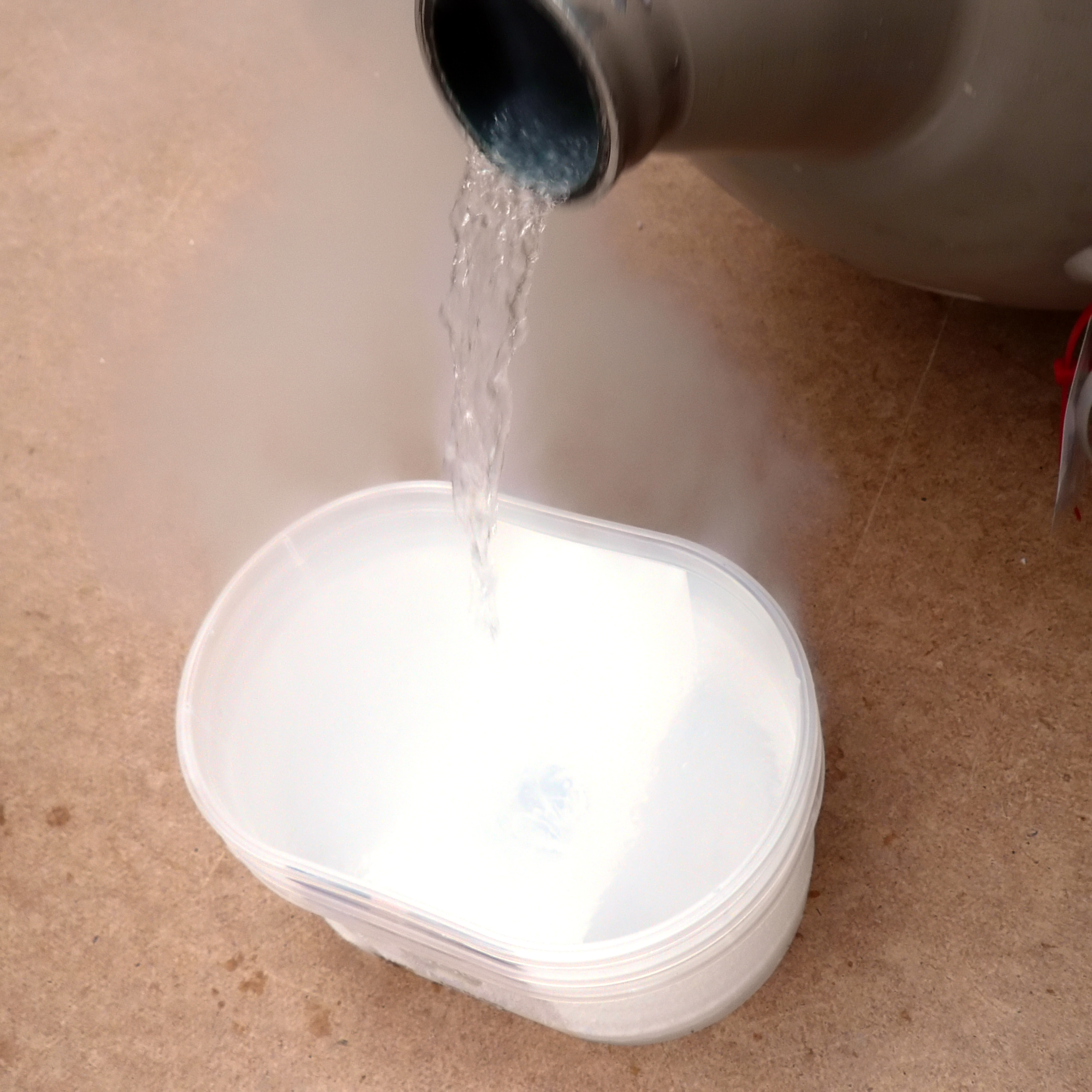
Nitrogen is a liquid under −195.8 °C (77.3 K).

In physics, cryogenics is the production and behaviour of materials at very low temperatures.

The 13th International Institute of Refrigeration's (IIR) International Congress of Refrigeration (held in Washington, DC in 1971) endorsed a universal definition of "cryogenics" and "cryogenic" by accepting a threshold of 120 K (−153.15 °C) to distinguish these terms from conventional refrigeration. This is a logical dividing line, since the normal boiling points of the so-called permanent gases (such as helium, hydrogen, neon, nitrogen, oxygen, and normal air) lie below 120 K, while the Freon refrigerants, hydrocarbons, and other common refrigerants have boiling points above 120 K.

Discovery of superconducting materials with critical temperatures significantly above the boiling point of nitrogen has provided new interest in reliable, low-cost methods of producing high-temperature cryogenic refrigeration. The term "high temperature cryogenic" describes temperatures ranging from above the boiling point of liquid nitrogen, −195.79 °C (77.36 K; −320.42 °F), up to −50 °C (223 K; −58 °F). The discovery of superconductive properties is first attributed to Heike Kamerlingh Onnes on 10 July 1908, after they were able to reach a temperature of 2 K. These first superconductive properties were observed in mercury at a temperature of 4.2 K.

Cryogenicists use the Kelvin or Rankine temperature scale, both of which measure from absolute zero, rather than more usual scales such as Celsius which measures from the freezing point of water at sea level or Fahrenheit which measures from the freezing point of a particular brine solution at sea level.

== Definitions and distinctions ==
=== Cryogenics ===
The branches of engineering that involve the study of very low temperatures (ultra low temperature i.e. below 123 K), how to produce them, and how materials behave at those temperatures.

=== Cryobiology ===
The branch of biology involving the study of the effects of low temperatures on organisms (most often for the purpose of achieving cryopreservation). Other applications include Lyophilization (freeze-drying) of pharmaceutical components and medicine.

=== Cryoconservation of animal genetic resources ===
The conservation of genetic material with the intention of conserving a breed. The conservation of genetic material is not limited to non-humans. Many services provide genetic storage or the preservation of stem cells at birth. They may be used to study the generation of cell lines or for stem-cell therapy.

=== Cryosurgery ===
The branch of surgery applying cryogenic temperatures to destroy and kill tissue, e.g. cancer cells, commonly referred to as cryoablation.

=== Cryoelectronics ===
The study of electronic phenomena at cryogenic temperatures. Examples include superconductivity and variable-range hopping.

=== Cryonics ===
Cryopreserving humans and animals with the intention of future revival. "Cryogenics" is sometimes erroneously used to mean "cryonics" in popular culture and the press.

== Etymology ==
The word cryogenics stems from Greek κρύος (cryos) – "cold" + γενής (genis) – "generating".

== Cryogenic fluids ==
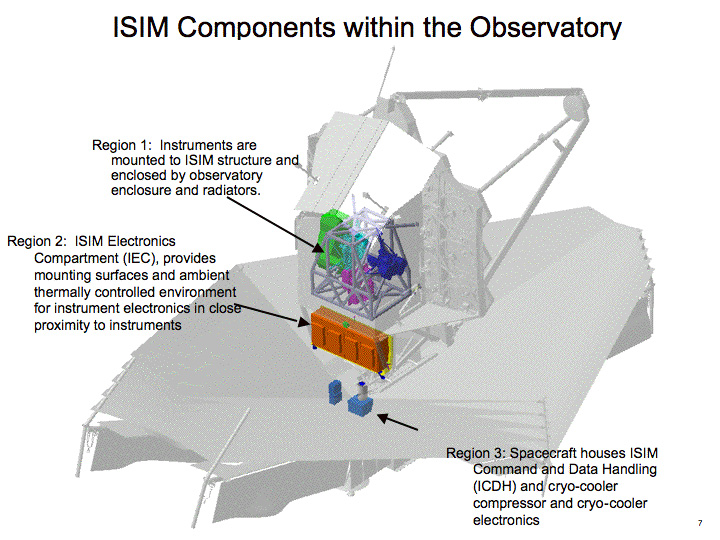
This is a diagram of an infrared space telescope that needs a cold mirror and instruments. One instrument needs to be even colder, and it has a cryocooler. The instrument is in region 1 and its cryocooler is in region 3 in a warmer region of the spacecraft (see MIRI (Mid-Infrared Instrument) or James Webb Space Telescope).

Cryogenic fluids with their boiling point in Kelvin and degree Celsius.

Fluid	Boiling point (K)	Boiling point (°C)
Helium-3	3.19	−269.96
Helium-4	4.214	−268.936
Hydrogen	20.27	−252.88
Neon	27.09	−246.06
Nitrogen	77.09	−196.06
Air	78.8	−194.35
Fluorine	85.24	−187.91
Argon	87.24	−185.91
Oxygen	90.18	−182.97
Methane	111.7	−161.45
Krypton	119.93	−153.415

== Industrial applications ==
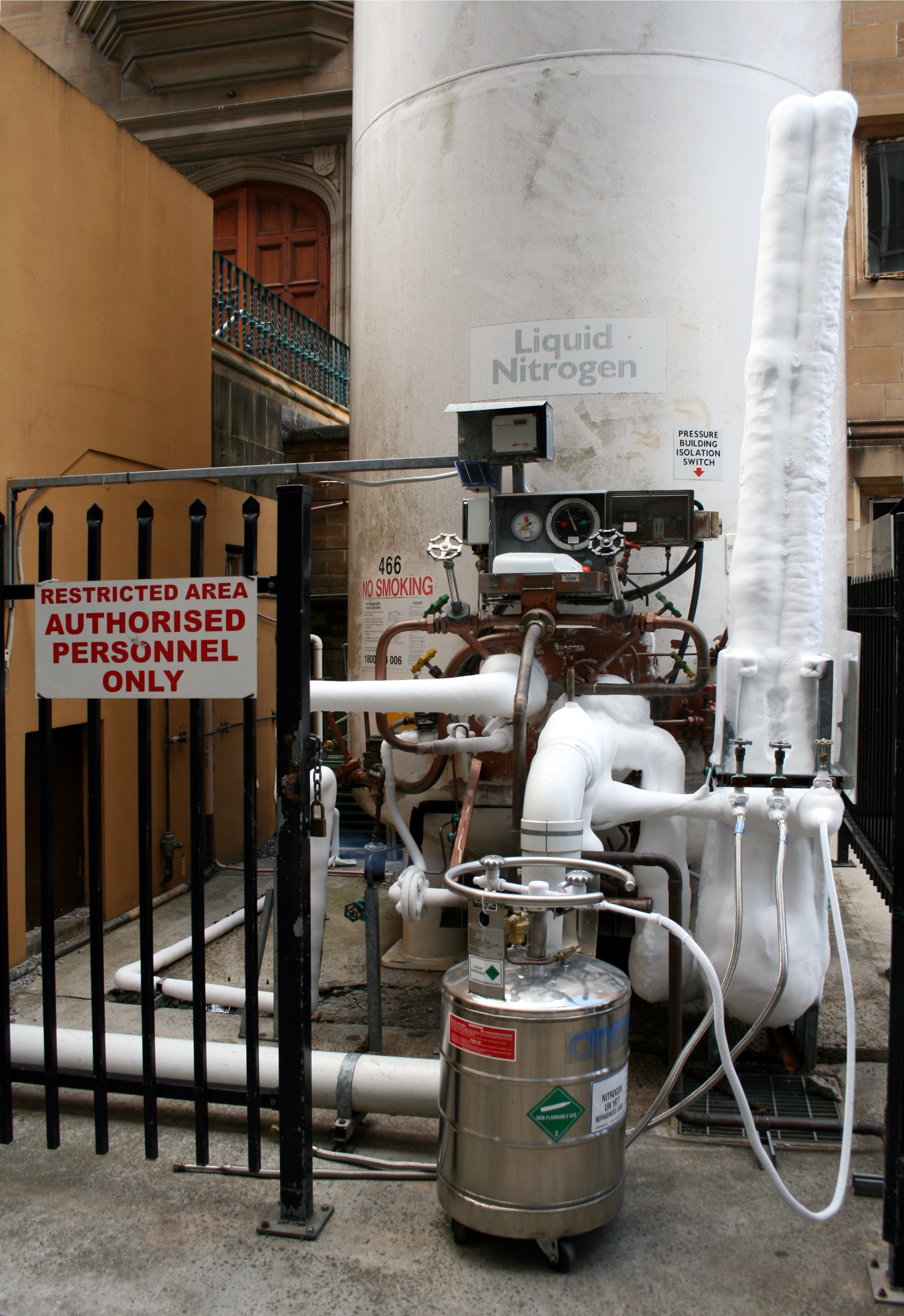
A medium-sized dewar is being filled with liquid nitrogen by a larger cryogenic storage tank.

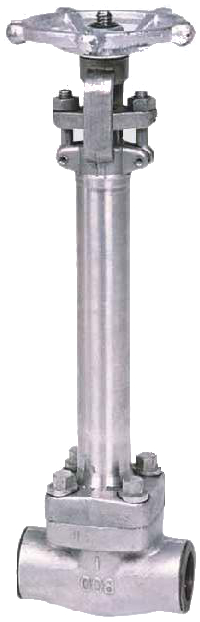
Catalogue image of a cryogenic valve

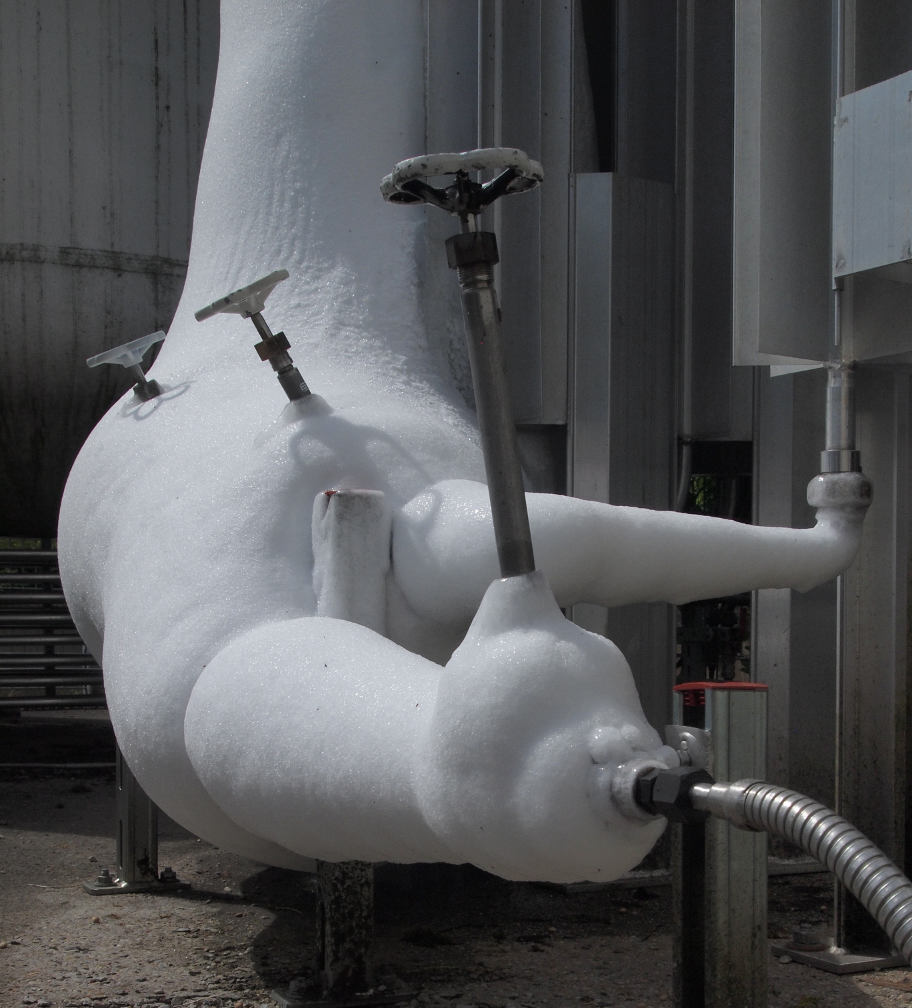
Cryogenic valves in situ, heavily frozen from condensed atmospheric humidity

Liquefied gases, such as liquid nitrogen and liquid helium, are used in many cryogenic applications. Liquid nitrogen is the most commonly used element in cryogenics and is legally purchasable around the world. Liquid helium is also commonly used and allows for the lowest attainable temperatures to be reached.

These liquids may be stored in Dewar flasks, which are double-walled containers with a high vacuum between the walls to reduce heat transfer into the liquid. Typical laboratory Dewar flasks are spherical, made of glass and protected in a metal outer container. Dewar flasks for extremely cold liquids such as liquid helium have another double-walled container filled with liquid nitrogen. Dewar flasks are named after their inventor, James Dewar, the man who first liquefied hydrogen. Thermos bottles are smaller vacuum flasks fitted in a protective casing.

Cryogenic barcode labels are used to mark Dewar flasks containing these liquids, and will not frost over down to −195 degrees Celsius.

Cryogenic transfer pumps are the pumps used on LNG piers to transfer liquefied natural gas from LNG carriers to LNG storage tanks, as are cryogenic valves.

=== Cryogenic processing ===
The field of cryogenics advanced during World War II when scientists found that metals frozen to low temperatures showed more resistance to wear. Based on this theory of cryogenic hardening, the commercial cryogenic processing industry was founded in 1966 by Bill and Ed Busch. With a background in the heat treating industry, the Busch brothers founded a company in Detroit called CryoTech in 1966. Busch originally experimented with the possibility of increasing the life of metal tools to anywhere between 200% and 400% of the original life expectancy using cryogenic tempering instead of heat treating. This evolved in the late 1990s into the treatment of other parts.

Cryogens, such as liquid nitrogen, are further used for specialty chilling and freezing applications. Some chemical reactions, like those used to produce the active ingredients for the popular statin drugs, must occur at low temperatures of approximately −100 °C (−148 °F). Special cryogenic chemical reactors are used to remove reaction heat and provide a low temperature environment. The freezing of foods and biotechnology products, like vaccines, requires nitrogen in blast freezing or immersion freezing systems. Certain soft or elastic materials become hard and brittle at very low temperatures, which makes cryogenic milling (cryomilling) an option for some materials that cannot easily be milled at higher temperatures.

Cryogenic processing is not a substitute for heat treatment, but rather an extension of the heating–quenching–tempering cycle. Normally, when an item is quenched, the final temperature is ambient. The only reason for this is that most heat treaters do not have cooling equipment. There is nothing metallurgically significant about ambient temperature. The cryogenic process continues this action from ambient temperature down to −320 °F (140 °R; 78 K; −196 °C). In most instances the cryogenic cycle is followed by a heat tempering procedure. As all alloys do not have the same chemical constituents, the tempering procedure varies according to the material's chemical composition, thermal history and/or a tool's particular service application.

The entire process takes 3–4 days.

=== Fuels ===
Another use of cryogenics is cryogenic fuels for rockets with liquid hydrogen as the most widely used example, with liquid methane starting to become more prevalent in recent years. Liquid oxygen (LOX) is even more widely used but as an oxidizer, not a fuel. NASA's workhorse Space Shuttle used cryogenic hydrogen/oxygen propellant as its primary means of getting into orbit. LOX is also widely used with RP-1 kerosene, a non-cryogenic hydrocarbon, such as in the rockets built for the Soviet space program by Sergei Korolev.

Russian aircraft manufacturer Tupolev developed a version of its popular design Tu-154 with a cryogenic fuel system, known as the Tu-155. The plane uses a fuel referred to as liquefied natural gas or LNG, and made its first flight in 1989.

== Other applications ==
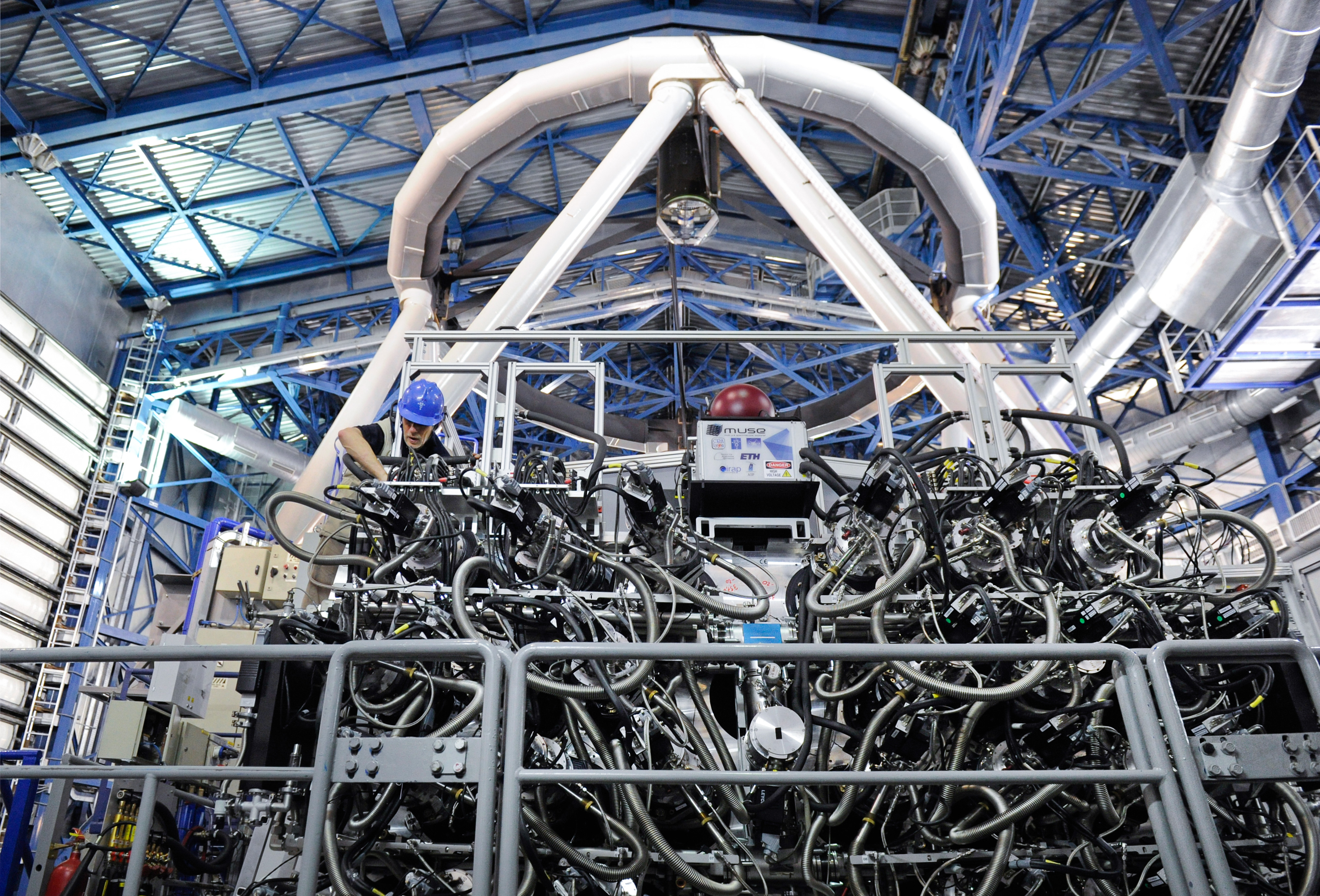
Astronomical instruments on the Very Large Telescope are equipped with continuous-flow cooling systems.

Some applications of cryogenics:

- Nuclear magnetic resonance (NMR) is one of the most common methods to determine the physical and chemical properties of atoms by detecting the radio frequency absorbed and subsequent relaxation of nuclei in a magnetic field. This is one of the most commonly used characterization techniques and has applications in numerous fields. Primarily, the strong magnetic fields are generated by supercooling electromagnets, although there are spectrometers that do not require cryogens. In traditional superconducting solenoids, liquid helium is used to cool the inner coils because it has a boiling point of around 4 K at ambient pressure. Inexpensive metallic superconductors can be used for the coil wiring. So-called high-temperature superconducting compounds can be made to super conduct with the use of liquid nitrogen, which boils at around 77 K.
- Magnetic resonance imaging (MRI) is a complex application of NMR where the geometry of the resonances is deconvoluted and used to image objects by detecting the relaxation of protons that have been perturbed by a radio-frequency pulse in the strong magnetic field. This is most commonly used in health applications.
- Cryogenic electron microscopy (cryoEM) is a popular method in structural biology for elucidating the structures of proteins, cells, and other biological systems. Samples are plunge-frozen into a cryogen such as liquid ethane cooled by liquid nitrogen, and are then kept at liquid nitrogen temperature as they are inserted into an electron microscope for imaging. Electron microscopes are also themselves cooled by liquid nitrogen.
- In large cities, it is difficult to transmit power by overhead cables, so underground cables are used. But underground cables get heated and the resistance of the wire increases, leading to waste of power. Superconductors could be used to increase power throughput, although they would require cryogenic liquids such as nitrogen or helium to cool special alloy-containing cables to increase power transmission. Several feasibility studies have been performed and the field is the subject of an agreement within the International Energy Agency.

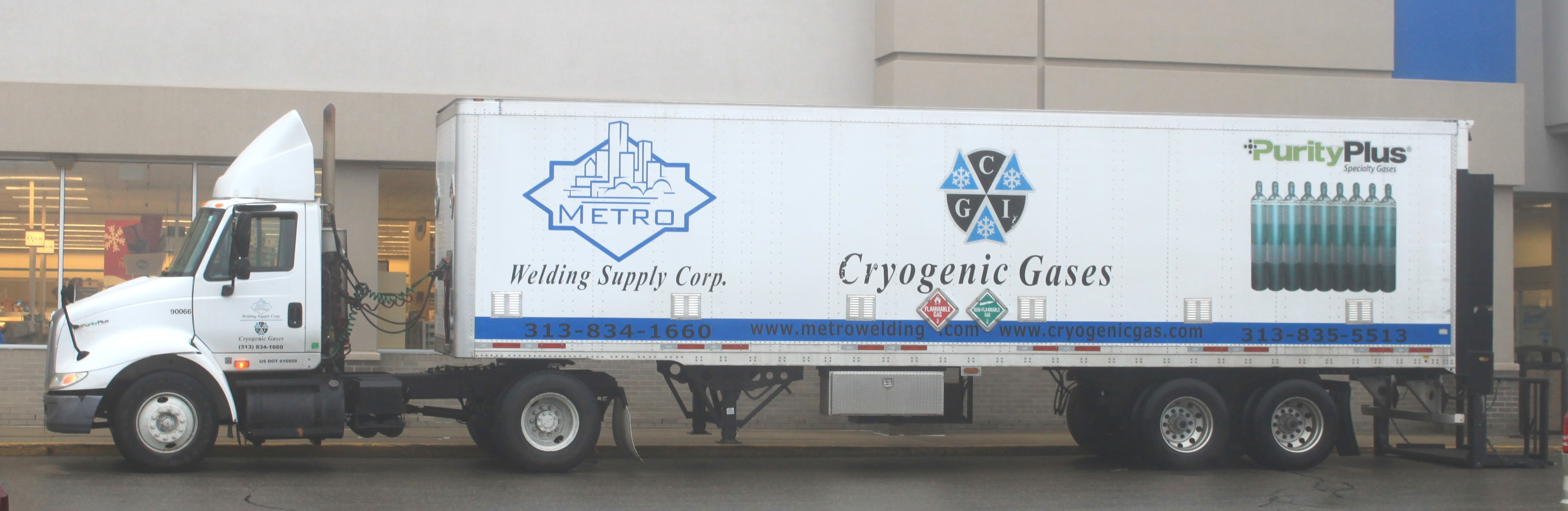
Cryogenic gases delivery truck at a supermarket, Ypsilanti, Michigan

- Cryogenic gases are used in transportation and storage of large masses of frozen food. When very large quantities of food must be transported to regions like war zones, earthquake hit regions, etc., they must be stored for a long time, so cryogenic food freezing is used. Cryogenic food freezing is also helpful for large scale food processing industries.
- Many infrared (forward looking infrared) cameras require their detectors to be cryogenically cooled.
- Certain rare blood groups are stored at low temperatures, such as −165 °C, at blood banks.
- Cryogenics technology using liquid nitrogen and CO_{2} has been built into nightclub effect systems to create a chilling effect and white fog that can be illuminated with colored lights.
- Cryogenic cooling is used to cool the tool tip at the time of machining in manufacturing process. It increases the tool life. Oxygen is used to perform several important functions in the steel manufacturing process.
- By freezing an automobile or truck tire in liquid nitrogen, the rubber is made brittle and can be crushed into small particles. These particles can be used again for other items.
- Experimental research on certain physics phenomena, such as spintronics and magnetotransport properties, requires cryogenic temperatures for the effects to be observable.
- Certain vaccines must be stored at cryogenic temperatures. For example, the Pfizer–BioNTech COVID-19 vaccine must be stored at temperatures of −90 to −60 °C (−130 to −76 °F). (See cold chain.)

== Production ==
Cryogenic cooling of devices and material is usually achieved via the use of liquid nitrogen, liquid helium, or a mechanical cryocooler (which uses high-pressure helium lines). Gifford-McMahon cryocoolers, pulse tube cryocoolers and Stirling cryocoolers are in wide use with selection based on required base temperature and cooling capacity. The most recent development in cryogenics is the use of magnets as regenerators as well as refrigerators. These devices work on the principle known as the magnetocaloric effect.

== Detectors ==
There are various cryogenic detectors which are used to detect particles.

For cryogenic temperature measurement down to 30 K, Pt100 sensors, a resistance temperature detector (RTD), are used. For temperatures lower than 30 K, it is necessary to use a silicon diode for accuracy.

== See also ==
- Absolute zero
- Lowest temperature recorded on Earth
- Cryogenic grinding
- Flash freezing
- Frozen food
