= Outline of grid energy storage =

Overview of and topical guide to grid energy storage

The following outline is provided as an overview of and topical guide to grid energy storage:

Grid energy storage – the collection of technologies connected to the electrical grid that store energy for later use. Grid energy storage can balance generation and consumption, integrate variable renewable energy, provide grid services, and improve grid reliability.

== Overview ==
- Distributed generation
- Dispatchable generation
- Electrical grid
- Electric power distribution
- Electric power transmission
- Energy storage
- Long-duration energy storage
- Power engineering
- Smart grid
- Variable renewable energy

== Roles and grid services ==
- Ancillary services (electric power)
- Black start
- Operating reserve
- Peak demand
- Power quality
- Spinning reserve
- Transmission congestion
- Utility frequency
- Voltage regulation

== Storage characteristics ==
- Charge cycle
- Depth of discharge
- Energy
- Energy density
- Long-duration energy storage
- Power
- Power density
- Roundtrip efficiency
- Self-discharge
- State of charge
- State of health

== Forms of grid energy storage ==
=== Electrochemical ===
- Flow battery
- Iron-air battery
- Lead–acid battery
- Lithium-ion battery
- Lithium iron phosphate battery
- Metal–air electrochemical cell
- Nickel–cadmium battery
- Sodium-ion battery
- Sodium–sulfur battery
- Vanadium redox battery
- Zinc–air battery

=== Mechanical ===
- Compressed-air energy storage
- Compressed carbon dioxide energy storage
- Cryogenic energy storage
- Flywheel energy storage
- Gravity battery
- Pumped-storage hydroelectricity

=== Chemical ===
- Ammonia
- Fuel cell
- Green hydrogen
- Hydrogen storage
- Methanol economy
- Power-to-gas
- Power-to-X
- Synthetic natural gas

=== Thermal ===
- Carnot battery
- Molten salt
- Phase-change material
- Pumped-heat electricity storage
- Seasonal thermal energy storage
- Thermal energy storage
- Underground thermal energy storage

=== Electrical ===
- Supercapacitor
- Superconducting magnetic energy storage

== Battery energy storage systems ==
- Battery management system
- Battery pack
- Electrical substation
- Power electronics
- Power inverter
- Protective relay
- Supervisory control and data acquisition
- Switchgear
- Transformer

== Grid integration and flexibility ==
- Curtailment (electricity)
- Demand response
- Distributed generation
- Duck curve
- Grid-connected photovoltaic power system
- Home energy storage
- Hybrid power
- Electricity interconnector
- Islanding
- Load following power plant
- Microgrid
- Peaking power plant
- Smart grid
- Variable renewable energy
- Vehicle-to-grid
- Virtual power plant

== Economics and electricity markets ==
- Capacity market
- Dynamic pricing
- Electric utility
- Electricity market
- Electricity pricing
- Energy storage as a service
- Independent system operator
- Levelized cost of storage
- Net metering

== Control and operation ==
- Energy management system
- Power-system automation
- Supervisory control and data acquisition
- Virtual power plant

== Safety ==
- Electrical safety
- Lithium-ion battery safety
- Plug-in electric vehicle fire
- Thermal runaway

== Environmental considerations ==
- Battery recycling
- Critical minerals
- Environmental impact of electricity generation
- Life-cycle assessment
- Water resources

== Companies and products ==
Companies

- Ambri
- Aquion Energy
- BYD
- CATL
- Energy Vault
- EVE Energy
- Form Energy
- Highview Power
- Hydrostor
- LG Energy Solution
- Natron Energy
- Tesla

Products

- Tesla Megapack
- Tesla Powerpack
- Tesla Powerwall
- UltraBattery

== Lists ==
- List of battery manufacturers
- List of electric vehicle battery manufacturers
- List of energy megaprojects
- List of energy storage projects
- List of energy storage power plants

== See also ==
- History of the battery
- Outline of electrical engineering
- Outline of energy
- Outline of energy development
- United States Department of Energy International Energy Storage Database
