= List of long-duration energy storage technologies =

This is a list of long-duration energy storage or LDES technologies which are energy storage systems designed to discharge electricity for multiple hours to days or longer. These systems are used to support power grid reliability, renewable energy integration, peak shifting, energy security, seasonal balancing, and grid resilience. LDES is typically defined as storage with discharge durations of 10 hours or more.

== List of technologies ==
=== Mechanical ===
- Compressed air energy storage – Method for matching variable production with demand
- Compressed carbon dioxide energy storage – Type of grid energy storage
- Gravity battery – Type of electrical storage device
- Liquid air energy storage – Use of low temperature liquids to store energy
- Pumped-storage hydroelectricity – Electric energy storage system

=== Electrochemical ===
- Flow battery
- Iron–air battery
- Lead–acid battery
- Lithium-ion battery
- Nickel–hydrogen battery
- Sodium-ion battery
- Sodium–nickel chloride battery
- Sodium–sulfur battery
- Vanadium redox battery
- Zinc–air battery

=== Thermal ===
- Carnot battery
- Molten salt energy storage
- Phase-change material
- Pumped-heat electricity storage
- Thermal energy storage
- Underground thermal energy storage

=== Chemical ===
- Ammonia energy storage
- Hydrogen storage
- Metal energy carriers
- Methanol energy storage
- Power-to-gas
- Synthetic natural gas

== See also ==
- Ancillary services – Services to support the transmission of electric power
- Dispatchable generation – Sources of electricity that can be used on demand
- Energy carrier – Type of fuel
- Grid energy storage – Large scale electricity supply management
- Natural gas storage – Facilities for storing natural gas
- Outline of grid energy storage
- Smart grid – Type of electrical grid
- Strategic natural gas reserve – Government-funded natural gas storage facility
