= Ice storage air conditioning =

Thermal energy storage by freezing water

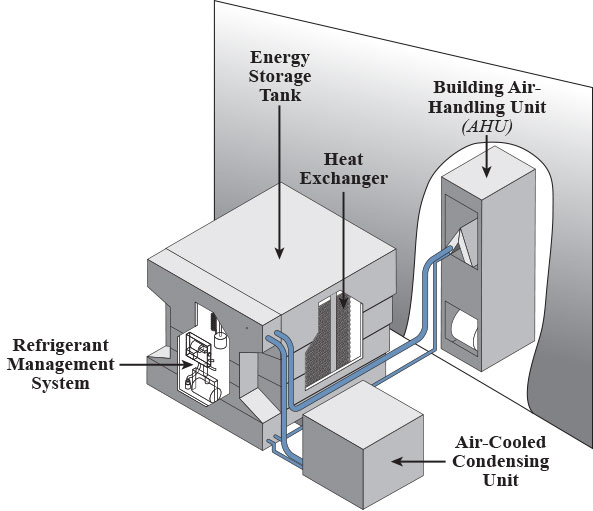
Illustration of an ice storage air conditioning unit in production.

Ice storage air conditioning is a form of thermal energy storage in which cooling capacity is stored by freezing water and recovered later by melting the ice. In building applications, the storage can be charged when cooling demand or electricity prices are lower and discharged during periods of higher cooling demand, reducing the electrical load associated with daytime chiller operation.

Ice is useful as a storage medium because water has a high latent heat of fusion. The latent heat of fusion of pure water is approximately 334 kJ/kg, so freezing or melting one metric tonne of water involves about 334 MJ (approximately 93 kWh) of thermal energy.

The traditional ton of refrigeration is related to the use of ice for cooling. ASHRAE defines one ton of refrigeration as a cooling rate of 12,000 Btu/h, approximately 3.517 kW, historically corresponding approximately to the heat required to melt one short ton of ice at 0 °C over 24 hours.

Ice thermal storage can also be integrated with renewable-energy systems. Experimental studies have demonstrated photovoltaic-powered air-conditioning systems in which solar electricity is used to make ice and the stored cooling is used later rather than storing the electricity entirely in batteries.

== Early ice storage, shipment, and production ==
Before widespread mechanical refrigeration, natural ice was harvested from frozen lakes and ponds and stored in insulated icehouses for use during warmer months. In the United States, commercial harvesting and distribution of natural ice expanded substantially during the nineteenth century. Ice was cut into blocks, stored in insulated facilities and transported to homes and businesses for food preservation and other cooling uses.

The development and spread of mechanical refrigeration gradually displaced natural-ice harvesting for most commercial cooling applications. The use of ice as a thermal-storage medium nevertheless continued in engineered refrigeration and air-conditioning systems.

== Air conditioning ==
Ice thermal energy storage is used in building cooling systems to separate the time when cooling is produced from the time when it is required. A chiller freezes water during a charging period. During discharge, the stored ice absorbs heat as it melts, reducing or replacing the cooling that otherwise would have to be supplied by the chiller at that time.

The systems are commonly divided into full-storage and partial-storage operating strategies. In a full-storage system, sufficient cooling is stored to meet the intended cooling load during the designated on-peak period, allowing the chiller to be shut down during that period. This requires greater storage capacity than a comparable partial-storage system.

In a partial-storage system, the chiller and thermal storage operate together during at least part of the cooling period. The chiller can therefore be sized below the building's maximum instantaneous cooling load, while stored cooling supplies the remaining demand during peak conditions. System sizing and control depend on the building cooling-load profile, available storage capacity, chiller performance and electricity tariff structure.

Ice storage is particularly applicable where electricity tariffs include substantial demand charges or where there is a significant difference between on-peak and off-peak electricity costs. Moving part of the chiller load away from peak periods can reduce peak electrical demand, although economic performance depends on equipment cost, operating strategy, climate and the applicable electricity tariff.

Producing ice requires the refrigeration system to operate at a lower evaporating temperature than is normally required for conventional chilled-water production. This can reduce instantaneous chiller efficiency during charging. The overall performance of a thermal-storage system therefore depends on both refrigeration efficiency and the operational benefit obtained by shifting cooling production to another time.

Several physical arrangements are used for ice thermal storage. These include ice-on-coil systems, encapsulated ice systems, ice slurry systems and other configurations that differ in how the ice is formed and how heat is transferred during charging and discharging.

=== Integration with solar power ===
Ice storage can be combined with photovoltaic generation to shift solar-derived cooling between periods of production and demand. Experimental systems have used photovoltaic electricity to operate refrigeration equipment during periods of solar generation while storing part of the resulting cooling as ice for later use.

Research has also investigated photovoltaic air-conditioning systems in which ice thermal storage reduces or replaces the need for electrochemical battery storage for the cooling load.

== Combustion gas turbine air inlet cooling ==
Ice thermal storage can also be used for gas turbine inlet-air cooling. Gas-turbine output and efficiency generally decrease as ambient inlet-air temperature rises. Cooling the compressor inlet increases air density and mass flow through the turbine and can increase net power output.

In an ice-storage inlet-cooling system, refrigeration equipment produces and stores ice before the high-temperature operating period. During periods of high ambient temperature or high electricity demand, chilled water or another heat-transfer fluid from the storage system is circulated through a heat exchanger in the turbine inlet-air path. The stored cooling reduces the inlet-air temperature and can increase turbine power output during those periods.

Ice thermal storage for turbine inlet cooling has been studied from thermodynamic and economic perspectives because the storage allows refrigeration production and turbine inlet cooling to occur at different times.

== See also ==
- Ice house (building)
- Energy storage
- Thermal energy storage
- Solar thermal energy
- Pumpable ice technology
- List of energy storage projects

== Air conditioning ==
The most widely used form of this technology can be found in campus-wide air conditioning or chilled water systems of large buildings. Air conditioning systems, especially in commercial buildings, are the biggest contributors to peak electrical loads seen on hot summer days in various countries. In this application, a standard chiller runs at night to produce an ice pile. Water then circulates through the pile during the day to produce chilled water that would normally be the chiller's daytime output.

A partial storage system minimizes capital investment by running the chillers nearly 24 hours a day. At night, they produce ice for storage and during the day they chill water for the air conditioning system. Water circulating through the melting ice augments their production. Such a system usually runs in ice-making mode for 16 to 18 hours a day and in ice-melting mode for six hours a day. Capital expenditures are minimized because the chillers can be just 40 - 50% of the size needed for a conventional design. Ice storage sufficient to store half a day's rejected heat is usually adequate.

A full storage system minimizes the cost of energy to run that system by entirely shutting off the chillers during peak load hours. The capital cost is higher, as such a system requires somewhat larger chillers than those from a partial storage system, and a larger ice storage system.

The air conditioning chillers' efficiency is measured by their coefficient of performance (COP). In theory, thermal storage systems could make chillers more efficient because heat is discharged into colder nighttime air rather than warmer daytime air. In practice, heat loss overpowers this advantage, since it melts the ice.

Air conditioning thermal storage has been shown to be somewhat beneficial in society. Off-peak electricity is cheaper, as demand is lower. It also reduces the demand at peak times, which is often provided by expensive and unenvironmental sources.

A new twist on this technology uses ice as a condensing medium for the refrigerant. In this case, regular refrigerant is pumped to coils where it is used. Rather than needing a compressor to convert it back into a liquid, however, the low temperature of ice is used to chill the refrigerant back into a liquid. This type of system allows existing refrigerant-based HVAC equipment to be converted to Thermal Energy Storage systems, something that could not previously be easily done with chilled water technology. In addition, unlike water-cooled chilled water systems that do not experience a tremendous difference in efficiency from day to night, this new class of equipment typically displaces daytime operation of air-cooled condensing units. In areas where there is a significant difference between peak day time temperatures and off-peak temperatures, this type of unit is typically more energy efficient than the equipment that it replaces.

== Combustion gas turbine air inlet cooling ==
Thermal energy storage is also used for combustion gas turbine air inlet cooling. Instead of shifting electrical demand to the night, this technique shifts generation capacity to the day. To generate ice at night, the turbine is often mechanically connected to a large chiller's compressor. During peak daytime loads, water is circulated between the ice pile and a heat exchanger in front of the turbine air intake, cooling the intake air to near freezing temperatures. Since the air is colder, the turbine can compress more air with a given amount of compressor power. Typically, both the generated electrical power and turbine efficiency rise when the inlet cooling system is activated. This system is similar to the compressed air energy storage system.

== See also ==
- Icehouse (early version)
- Energy storage
- Solar thermal energy
- Pumpable ice technology
- List of energy storage projects
