= Compressed carbon dioxide energy storage =

Type of grid energy storage

Compressed carbon dioxide energy storage can be used to store electrical energy at grid scale. The gas is well suited to this role because, unlike most gases, it liquifies under pressure at ambient temperatures, so occupies a small volume.

== Process ==
A 100 MWh store requires about 2000 tonnes of carbon dioxide (CO_{2}). At the start of the process, CO_{2} gas is stored at atmospheric pressure and temperature in a large expandable fabric container, like those used to store biogas, housed within an inflatable protective dome.

To store energy, the gaseous CO_{2} is compressed to around 70 bar, which heats it to around 400 °C. Passing it through a heat exchanger and a thermal store cools the supercritical carbon dioxide gas enough to liquify it under 32 °C. The liquid CO_{2} can be stored in this state indefinitely in pressurised cylinders.

When energy is required, the CO_{2} is passed back through the heat exchanger, where it is warmed by recovering the heat from the heatstore and reverts to high-pressure gas. The expanding gas is used to drive a turbine to generate electricity as it passes back into the low pressure store, completing the closed cycle.

== Advantages ==
Liquid carbon dioxide can be stored at ambient temperatures, unlike Liquid air energy storage (LAES), which must keep liquid air cold at −192°C, though the CO_{2} does need to be kept pressurised.

Liquid CO_{2} has a much higher energy density (66.7 kWh/m^{3}), than compressed air in typical to compressed-air energy storage (CAES) systems (2-6 kWh/m^{3}), meaning the same energy can be stored in a much smaller volume.

All the components of the system are readily available: gas storage domes are used in biogas production; the compressors&turbines and heat exchangers are used in the oil and gas industries; the turbine is similar to a medium pressure steam turbine, but smaller for the same power.

== Disadvantages ==
The gas domes take up land — approximately 6% of the land area of a matching solar farm.

Carbon dioxide is an odourless asphyxiating gas that is heavier than air. A catastrophic rupture of a storage dome in, say, a hurricane would disperse the gas harmlessly. However in still air, any leakage of gas would accumulate in any nearby depressions and constitute a potentially fatal hazard.

=== China ===
A 100 MW/1,000 MWh compressed carbon dioxide (CO₂) energy storage plant was connected to grid in 2026, with 600 MW of wind power and 400 MW of solar power in Mulei in China.

=== USA ===
In 2023, Alliant Energy announced plans to construct a 200-MWh compressed CO_{2} facility based on the Sardinia facility in Columbia County, Wisconsin. It will be the first of its kind in the United States.

== Energy Dome ==
The start-up company Energy Dome built a 2.5 MW/4 MWh demonstrator plant in Ottana Sardinia, for the Italian utility company A2A, which came into operation in June 2022. The company claims a round trip efficiency of 75% and a projected cost of EUR 220/kWh of storage capacity, which was half that of lithium-ion battery in 2023, when Energy Storage News reported that it may be "a cheaper form of energy storage than lithium-ion batteries".

Construction of a standardised 20 MW/200 MWh energy storage unit started at the same site, in conjunction with thermal power station engineering group Ansaldo Energia. The 20 MW facility started operating in July 2025.

During 2025 a 1600 MWh storage plant is planned in Laihia, Finland, by EPV Energia. The investment proposal is in impact assessment stage and up for approval in 2027.

== See also ==
- List of long-duration energy storage technologies
