= Gravity battery =

Type of electrical storage device

Energy from a source such as sunlight is used to lift a mass such as water upward against the force of gravity, giving it potential energy. The stored potential energy is later converted to electricity that is added to the power grid, even when the original energy source is not available.

A gravity battery is a type of energy storage device that stores gravitational energy—the potential energy given to an object when it is raised against the force of gravity.

In a common application, when renewable energy sources such as wind and solar provide more energy than is immediately required, the excess energy is used to move a mass upward against the force of gravity to generate gravitational potential energy. When customers eventually require more energy than the sources can provide, the mass is lowered to convert the potential energy into electricity using an electric generator. Though solid masses such as concrete blocks can be used, more commonly, pumped-storage hydroelectricity generation involves pumping water to higher elevations and later guiding it through water turbines to generate electricity.

== Technical background ==
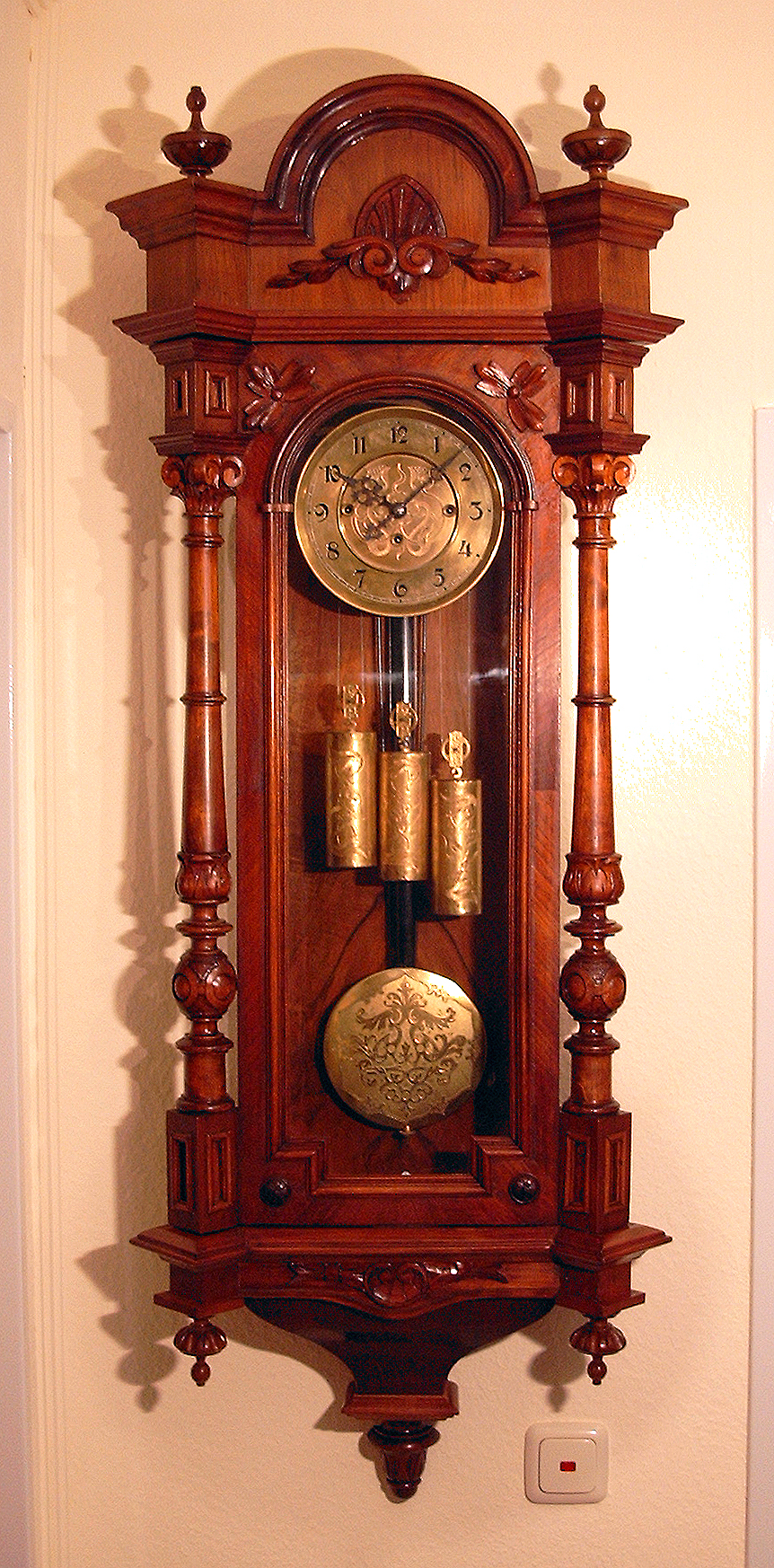
Pendulum clock driven by three weights as "gravity battery"

An old and simple application is the pendulum clock driven by a weight, which at 1 kg and 1 m travel can store nearly 10 newton-meters [Nm], or equivalently, 10 joules [J], 10 watt-seconds [Ws], or 1/360 of a watt-hour [Wh]. By comparison, a typical Lithium-ion battery 18650 cell can hold about 7 Wh, or about 2500 times the energy at 1/20 of the weight. A 100 kg human would have to climb stairs of ten floors (25 m) to match the little battery cell. A 10 ton weight descending 250 metres, equals 7 kWh of gravity battery, the size of a small electric motorcycle battery, or the first series of Tesla Powerwall home storage battery.

Using a weight the size of a bus made of scrap iron, at 700 tons, lowered into a 1000 m deep mine shaft, would provide 1900 kWh, but at over US$100 per ton of scrap iron, would cost US$70000, which in 2023 already could buy over 500 kWh of lithium-ion battery packs at US$139 per kWh.

To challenge chemical batteries on planet Earth, with g around 9.8 m/s², and height differences limited to those of mountains or ocean sea beds, only the mass can be scaled, using water in at least two lakes for pumped-storage hydroelectricity. For example, up to 4 Gigawatthours (GWh) of energy can be stored at Markersbach plant in Germany, which operates since 1979, using two water reservoirs of over 6 million m3 capacity (6 million tons of mass) with a height difference (hydraulic head) of 288 m (945 ft). The turbines can pump, or generate, at up to 1045 MW, for several hours, and usually two full pump-generate cycles within 24 hours. In Germany as of June 2024, pumped storage can hold a total energy of 39 GWh while battery storage is over 14 GWh, with installed power at just under 10 GW for each. The capacity of the 1,4 million battery electric cars in Germany is estimated at around 102 GWh as of June 2024; only few of them can feed back energy into a house, or the grid. Five years before the Markersbach plant opened, work began on the Dinorwig pumped storage Power Station in Snowdonia (Eryri) in North Wales. Utilising a disused quarry as a reservoir and with the machinery inside a mountain, the plant opened in 1984. It has a storage capacity of approx. 9.1 GWh (33TJ) and can supply a maximum power of 1,728 MW. It is described as the largest pumped storage power station in Europe. Development of the Dinorwig facility was preceded by the opening in 1963 of the smaller Ffestiniog power station, with a capacity of 1.44GWh, and a maximum output of 360MW.

== Development ==
The earliest form of a device that used gravity to power mechanical movement was the pendulum clock, invented in 1656 by Christiaan Huygens. The clock was powered by the force of gravity using an escapement mechanism, that made a pendulum move back and forth. Since then, gravity batteries have advanced into systems that can utilize the force due to gravity, and turn it into electricity for large scale energy storage.

The first gravity based pumped-storage hydroelectricity (PSH) system was developed in 1907 in Switzerland. In 1930, pumped-storage came to the United States by the Connecticut Electric and Power Company. As of 2019, the total world capacity for PSH is 168 GW (gigawatts). The United States has 23 GW capacity from PSH, accounting for nearly 2% of the energy supply system and 95% of utility-scale energy storage in the US. Gravity based pumped-storage electricity is currently the largest form of grid energy storage in the world.

In 2012, Martin Riddiford and Jim Reeves developed the first functioning prototype of GravityLight, a small-scale gravity battery that is now commercially available in certain countries.

Energy Vault, a Swiss company founded in 2017, stores electricity using a crane that raises and lowers blocks of concrete. In late 2020, a prototype built in Arbedo-Castione used six cranes on a 110-meter-high tower to move 35-ton concrete blocks with a capacity of 80 megawatt hours. In May 2024, the 25 MW/100 MWh Rudong EVx gravity energy storage system (GESS) situated in Rudong County (at coordinates 32.526 121.091) was commissioned by China Tianying Co. (CNTY). On the other hand, in September 2025, Energy Vault Holdings has contracted the supply of 3 GWh of battery energy storage systems (BESS) from Chinese lithium-ion battery manufacturer REPT BATTERO Energy Co Ltd for projects in the US.

Gravitricity, founded in 2011 by Peter Fraenkel, built a 15-meter 250-kilowatt gravity battery prototype near Edinburgh, Scotland that started trial operations and grid-connection in April 2021.

== Mechanisms and parts ==
Gravity batteries can have different designs and structures, but all gravity batteries use the same properties of physics to generate energy. Gravitational potential energy is the work required to move an object in the opposite direction of Earth's gravity, expressed by the equation

$$U = mgh$$

where $U$ is gravitational potential energy, $m$ is the mass of the object, $g$ is the acceleration due to gravity (9.8 m/s^{2} on earth), and $h$ is the height of the object. Using the work-energy principle, the total amount of energy generated can be expressed by the equation

$$\Delta E=mg(h_1- h_2)$$

where $E$ is the total amount of energy generated and $h_1$ and $h_2$ represent the initial and final heights of an object. The change of energy directly correlates to the vertical displacement of a mass; the higher a mass is lifted, the more gravitational potential energy is stored. The change in energy also directly correlates to the mass of an object; the heavier the mass, the bigger the change in energy.

For example, a weight with the mass of 1,000 kg (1 metric ton) must be elevated to the height of around 367 m (1,200 ft) to store the energy of 1 kWh.

In a gravity battery, a mass is displaced, or lifted, to generate gravitational potential energy that is transformed into electricity. Gravity batteries store gravitational potential energy by lifting a mass to a certain height using a pump, crane, or motor. After the mass is lifted, it now stores a certain gravitational potential energy based on the mass of the object and how high it was lifted. The stored gravitational potential energy is then transferred into electricity. The mass is lowered to fall back to its original height, which causes a generator to spin and create electricity.

== Types of gravity batteries ==
=== Large scale ===
Pumped-storage hydroelectricity (PSH) is the most widely used and highest-capacity form of grid-energy storage. In PSH, water is pumped from a lower reservoir to a higher reservoir, which can then be released through turbines to produce energy. An alternative PSH proposal uses a proprietary high-density liquid, 2 1/2 times denser than water, which requires a smaller head (elevation) and thus decreases the size and cost of the necessary infrastructure.

Energy-storage-by-rail is a concept where excess renewable energy is used to run heavy train cars uphill during times of low energy demand. The potential energy is released later by using regenerative braking as they roll downhill, acting as a gravity battery. A utility-scale (50 MW) facility called GravityLine began construction in October 2020 by Advanced Rail Energy Storage, located at the Gamebird Pit gravel mine in the Pahrump Valley, Nevada, and is planned to deliver up to 15 minutes of service at full capacity.

Lift Renewable Energy uses a form of gravity battery. To store energy, buoyant gas containers are pulled down into water by a winch, water is in effect lifted hundreds of meters. The cycle is then reversed and electricity is generated as the gas containers rise. Relatively little infrastructure is required, the batteries can be sited near major population centers, round-trip efficiency is 85+%, and the system can be built at a GWh scale.

Lifted Weight Storage (LWS) technology uses surplus energy to mechanically lift solid weights vertically, typically on a pulley system. When extra energy is needed, the mass is lowered, and the pulley turns a generator.

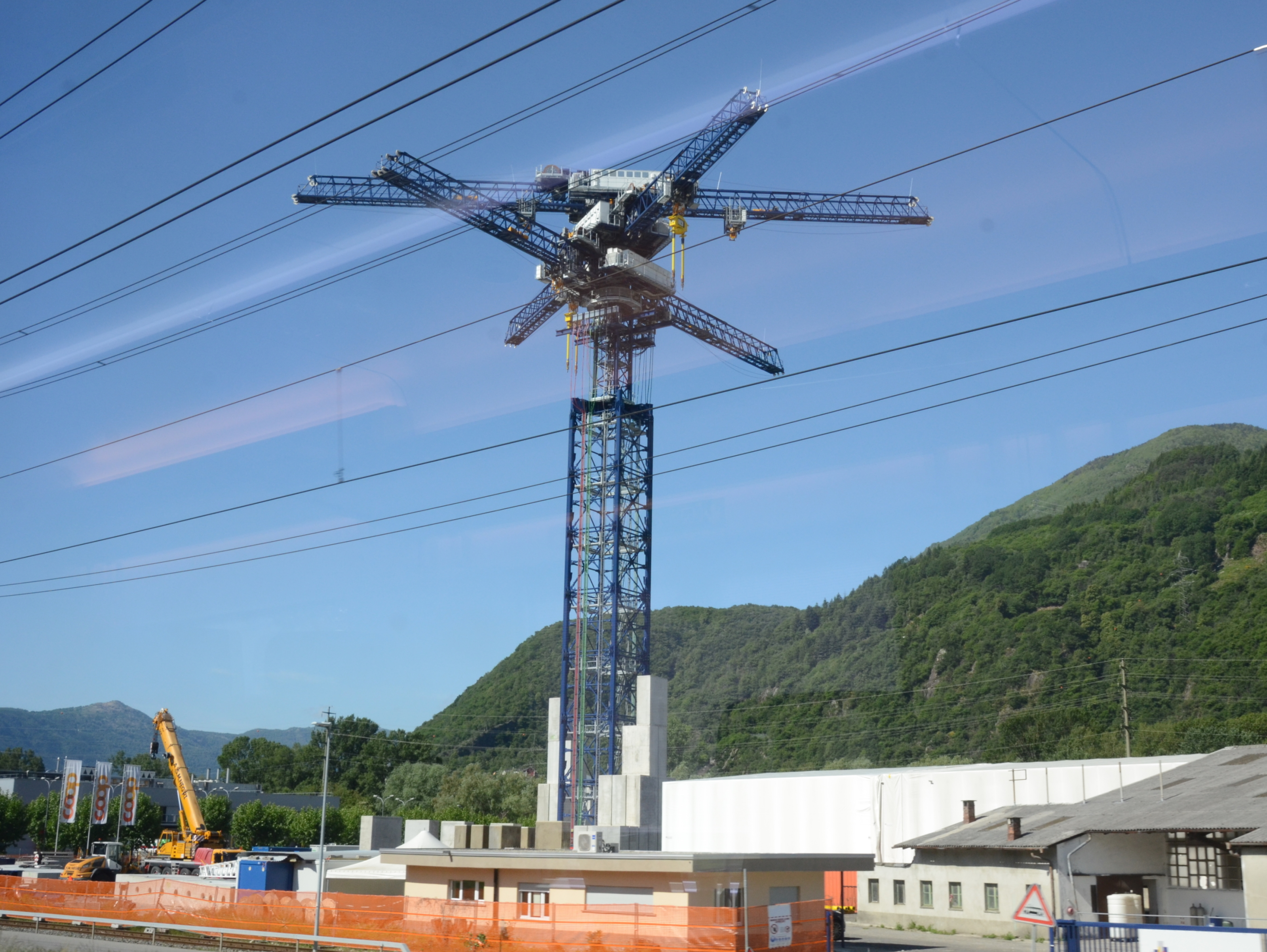
Energy Vault 60 meter prototype in Arbedo-Castione, Switzerland, in 2021

EnergyVault is designing a LWS system using a tower built from 32-ton concrete blocks, stacked with 120-meter cranes. One commercial unit is expected to store 20 MWh of energy, or enough to power 2,000 Swiss homes a day.

Gravitricity's LWS system in an underground shaft uses an electric winch to lift a 500-to-5000-tonne weight, which when lowered turns the winch motor as a generator. The system generates 10 MWh, enough to power 13,000 homes for two hours. The weight can also be dropped quickly for a small burst of power.

=== Criticism ===
Lift weight storage (LWS) is not without criticism. In 2011, Tom Murphy calculated the usefulness of gravity battery concepts, like stacking blocks of concrete, and came to the conclusion that gravitational storage is "incredibly weak" compared to chemical, compressed air, or flywheel techniques. To get the amount of energy stored in a single AA battery (some 3 Wh), 100 kg (220 lb) would have to be lifted by 10 m (33 ft) to match it.

China has recently (2023–25) committed to erecting a colossal lift-weight-storage structure as a significant trial of this type of system. With a sizeable investment, the Rudong County LWS installation has potential to contribute valuable information by disclosing whether or not the system can approach the proposed 100MW-hour announced as the objective. Whatever the outcome, it may bear on Murphy's criticism.

=== Small scale ===
GravityLight is a small gravity-powered light that operates by manually lifting a bag of rocks or sand up and then letting it fall by itself to generate energy. It is designed as an alternative for those who do not have access to electricity and typically rely on kerosene lamps, which are expensive, dangerous, and polluting.

== Economics and efficiency ==
Cost of gravity batteries varies by design.

Pumped storage hydropower costs $165/MWh to operate, with a levelized cost of storage (LCOS), of $0.17/kWh. The pumps and turbines of PSH systems operate at up to 90% efficiency.

Gravitricity's 250 kW demonstrator is expected to be $1.25 million, promising a 50-year lifespan and efficiency of 80–90%. A 2018 comparative review of the proposition was favorable considering the extended lifespan and power-to-energy cost ratio.

Gravity batteries can make solar and wind more viable as they can store the excess energy they make during peak hours and distribute it later when needed.

== Environmental impacts ==
Gravity batteries are designed to be paired with renewable energy solutions whose sources (sunlight, wind, etc) are frequently variable and do not necessarily coincide with demand. It is hoped that they will have a better long term cost than chemical batteries, while having fewer environmental issues than other traditional storage solutions such as pumped-water storage. It is anticipated that gravity battery systems will be able to quickly provide power during peak consumption which may allow them to supplement or replace fossil fuel peaking power plants. Single weight systems are expected to be able to achieve full power generation in less than a second.

Among low-carbon long-duration energy storage methods, pumped storage hydropower had the lowest current energy cost, though lithium-ion batteries are expected to overtake it in the future. Pumped storage hydropower and other long-duration storage methods are considered to have low environmental and security risks compared to battery technology, with the only limiting factor being geology.

== Gravity (chemical) battery ==
From 1870 to 1930, the term "gravity battery" was used to describe a collection of popular battery types where gravity was used to keep the chemical constituents separate based on their respective densities.

== See also ==
- Flywheel energy storage
- Grid energy storage
- Pumped-storage hydroelectricity
