= United States Department of Energy Global Energy Storage Database =

The United States Department of Energy's Global Energy Storage Database (GESDB) is a free-access database of energy storage projects and policies funded by the U.S. DOE, Office of Electricity, and Sandia National Labs.

In 2013, the database covered 409 projects; it aimed to cover all energy storage projects globally by 2014. By 2020, it covered 1,686 projects, comprising 22 gigawatt power of US grid storage capacity. Pumped-storage hydroelectricity is around 90% of the energy capacity.

== See also ==
- List of energy storage projects
- Energy storage
- Hydroelectricity
- Hydropower
- United States Department of Energy
