= Bottled gas =

Gas compressed and stored in cylinders

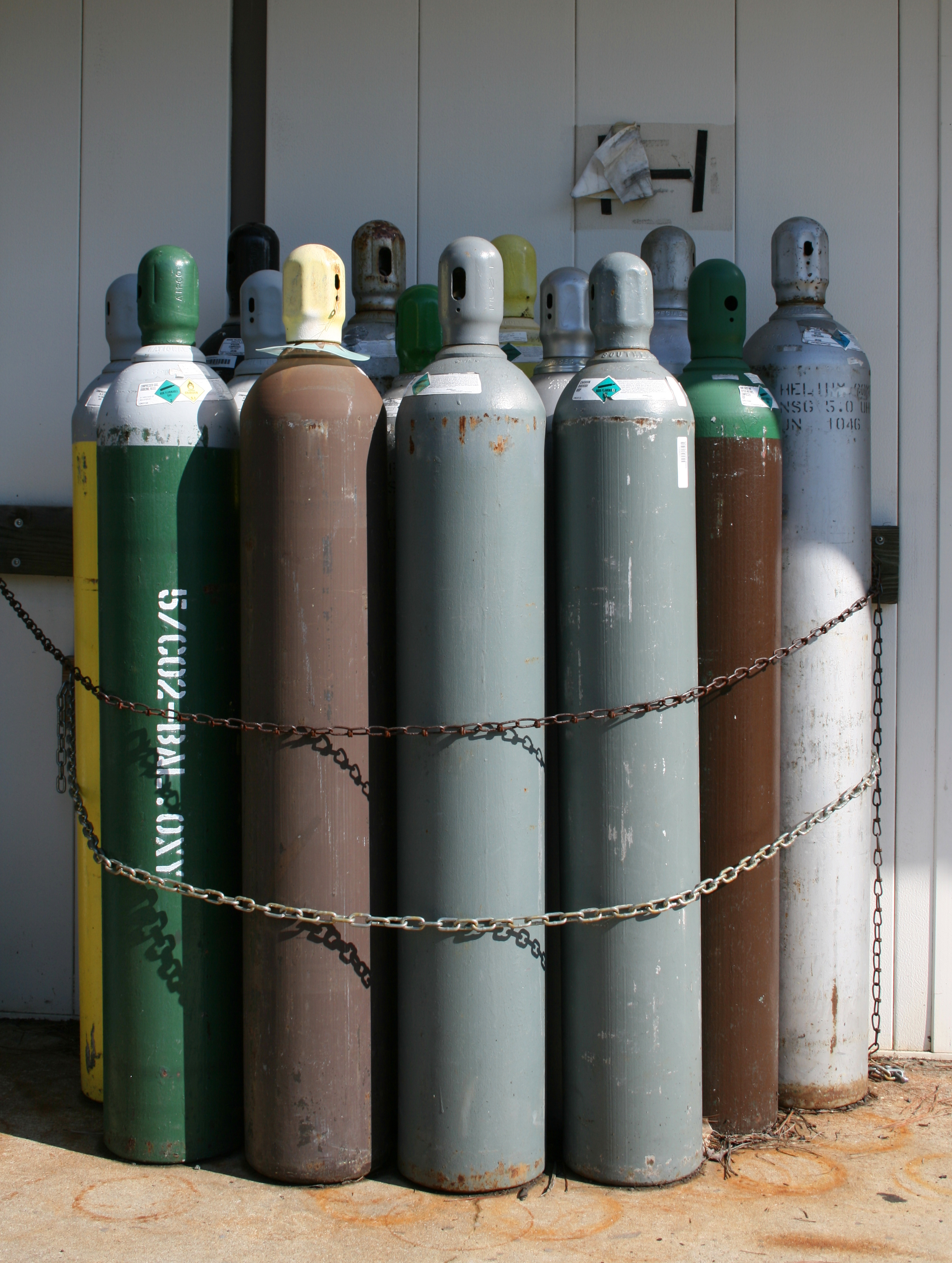
An assorted bundle of gas bottles at Duke University

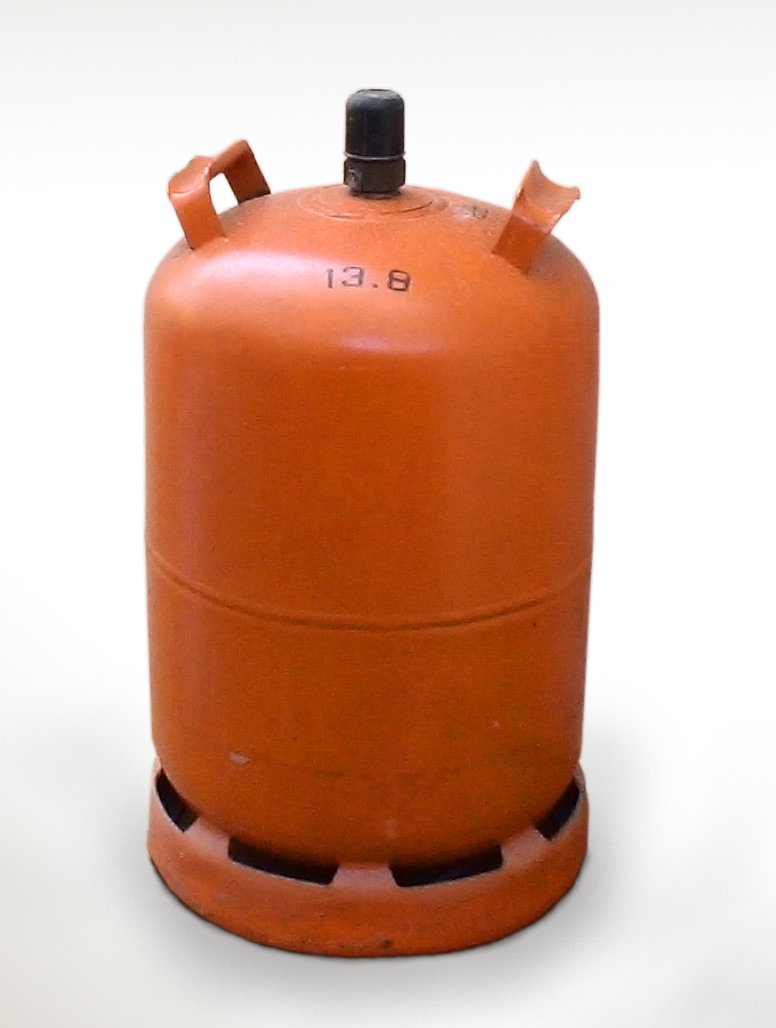
Butane gas cylinder

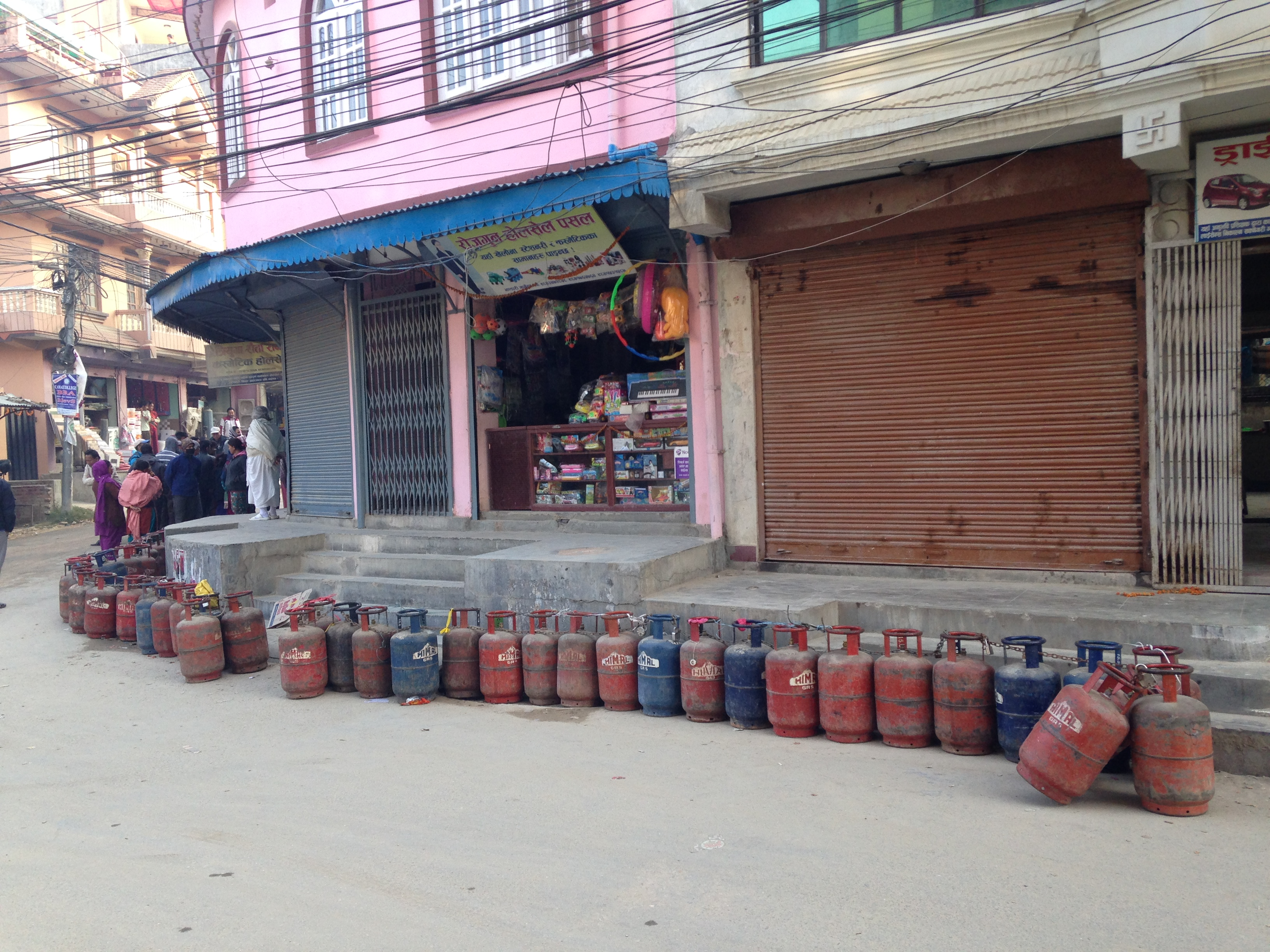
A line of liquefied petroleum gas cylinders on a street in Kathmandu

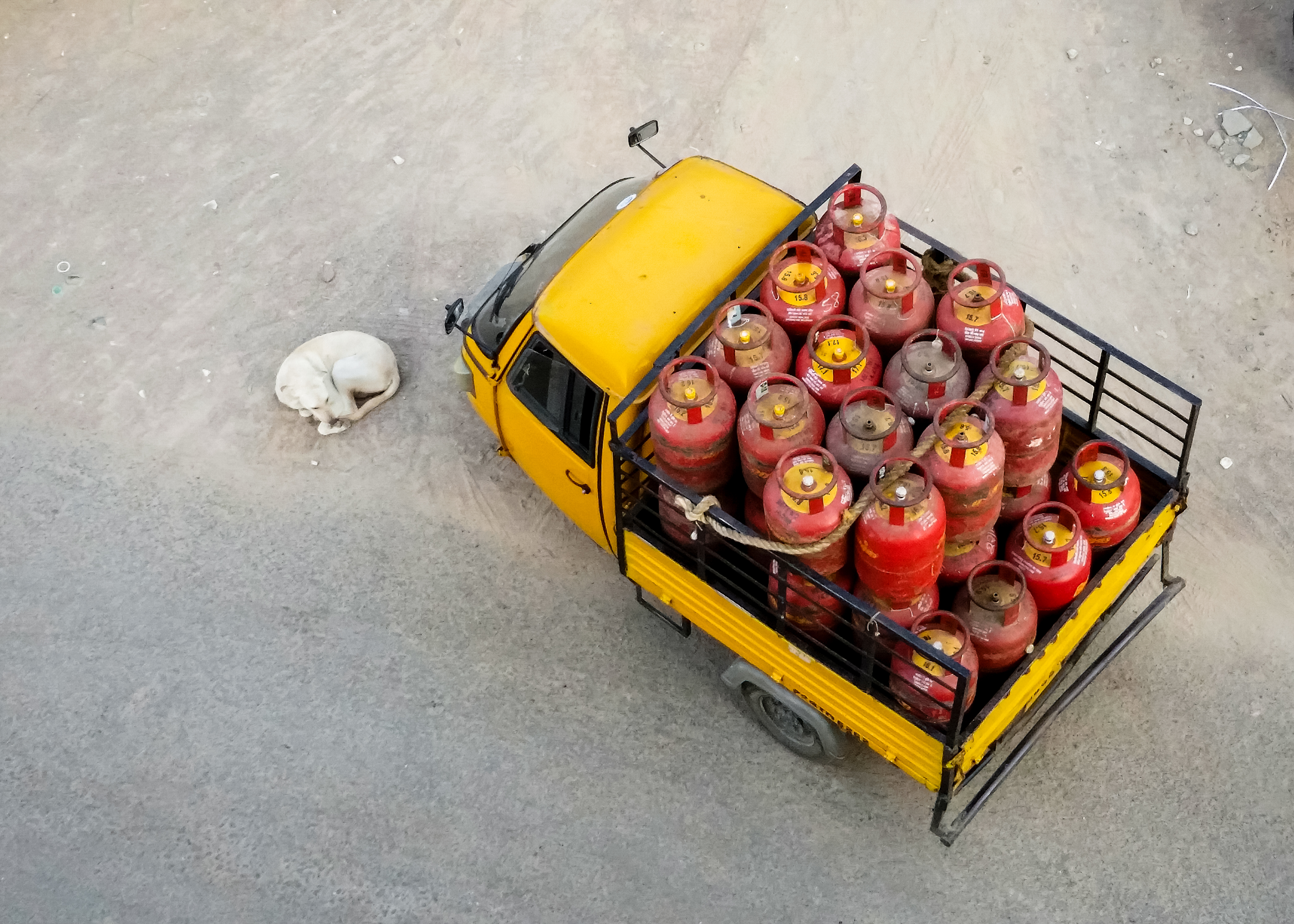
Delivery of liquefied petroleum gas cylinders in Hyderabad

Bottled gas is a term used for substances which are gaseous at standard temperature and pressure (STP) and have been compressed and stored in carbon steel, stainless steel, aluminum, or composite containers known as gas cylinders.

== Gas state in cylinders ==
There are four cases: either the substance remains a gas at standard temperature but increased pressure, the substance liquefies at standard temperature but increased pressure, the substance is dissolved in a solvent, or the substance is liquefied at reduced temperature and increased pressure. In the last case the bottle is constructed with an inner and outer shell separated by a vacuum (dewar flask) so that the low temperature can be maintained by evaporative cooling.

=== Case I ===
The substance remains a gas at standard temperature and increased pressure, its critical temperature being below standard temperature. Examples include:

- air
- argon
- fluorine
- helium
- hydrogen
- krypton
- nitrogen
- oxygen

=== Case II ===
The substance liquefies at standard temperature but increased pressure. Examples include:

- ammonia
- butane
- carbon dioxide (also packaged as a cryogenic gas, Case IV)
- chlorine
- nitrous oxide
- propane
- sulfur dioxide

=== Case III ===
The substance is dissolved at standard temperature in a solvent. Examples include:

- carbon dioxide in the form of a soft drink
- sulfur trioxide in the form of fuming sulfuric acid
- nitrogen dioxide in the form of red-fuming nitric acid
- hydrogen chloride in the form of muriatic acid
  - Note: these four are most often found in containers other than metal bottles, and at low pressure, e.g. 3 to 7 standard atmospheres (300 to 710 kPa).
- acetylene
  - Note: Acetylene cylinders contain an inert packing material, which may be agamassan, and are filled with a solvent such as acetone or dimethylformamide. The acetylene is pumped into the cylinder and it dissolves in the solvent. When the cylinder is opened the acetylene comes back out of solution, much like a carbonated beverage bubbles when opened. This is a workaround to acetylene's propensity to explode when pressurized above 200 kPa or liquified.

=== Case IV ===
The substance is liquefied at reduced temperature and increased pressure. These are also referred to as cryogenic gases. Examples include:

- liquid nitrogen (LN_{2})
- liquid hydrogen (LH_{2})
- liquid oxygen (LO_{X})
- carbon dioxide (also packaged as a liquefied gas, Case II)

Note: cryogenic gases are typically equipped with some type of 'bleed' device to prevent overpressure from rupturing the bottle and to allow evaporative cooling to continue.

== Expansion and volume ==
The general rule is that one unit volume of liquid will expand to approximately 800 unit volumes of gas at standard temperature and pressure with some variation due to intermolecular force and molecule size compared to an ideal gas. Normal high pressure gas cylinders will hold gas at pressures from 200 to 400 bars (3,000 to 6,000 psi). An ideal gas pressurised to 200 bar in a cylinder would contain 200 times as much as the volume of the cylinder at atmospheric pressure, but real gases will contain less than that by a few percent. At higher pressures, the shortfall is greater.

== Special handling considerations ==
Because the contents are under high pressure and are sometimes hazardous, there are special safety regulations for handling bottled gases. These include chaining bottles to prevent falling and breaking, proper ventilation to prevent injury or death in case of leaks and signage to indicate the potential hazards.

In the United States, the Compressed Gas Association (CGA) sells a number of booklets and pamphlets on safe handling and use of bottled gases. (Members of the CGA can get the pamphlets for free.) The European Industrial Gases Association and the British Compressed Gases Association provide similar facilities in Europe and the United Kingdom.

== Nomenclature differences ==
In the United States, 'bottled gas' typically refers to liquefied petroleum gas. 'Bottled gas' is sometimes used in medical supply, especially for portable oxygen tanks. Packaged industrial gases are frequently called 'cylinder gas', though 'bottled gas' is sometimes used.

The United Kingdom and other parts of Europe more commonly refer to 'bottled gas' when discussing any usage whether industrial, medical or liquefied petroleum. However, in contrast, what the United States calls liquefied petroleum gas is known generically in the United Kingdom as 'LPG'; and it may be ordered using by one of several Trade names, or specifically as butane or propane depending on the required heat output.

== Colour coding ==
Different countries have different gas colour codes but attempts are being made to standardise the colours of cylinder shoulders:

- Colours of cylinders for Medical gases are covered by an International Organization for Standardization (ISO) standard, ISO 32; but not all countries use this standard.
- Within Europe gas cylinders colours are being standardised according to EN 1089-3, the standard colours applying to the cylinder shoulder only; i.e., the top of the cylinder close to the pillar valve.
- In the United States, colour-coding is not regulated by law.

The user should not rely on the colour of a cylinder to indicate what it contains. The label or decal should always be checked for product identification.

=== European cylinder colours ===
The colours below are specific shades, defined in the European Standard in terms of RAL coordinates. The requirements are based on a combination of a few named gases, otherwise on the primary hazard associated with the gas contents:

==== Specific gases ====
Gas	Colour	RAL	Notes
Acetylene	maroon	3009	
Argon	dark green shoulder	6001	
Carbon dioxide	grey shoulder	7037	
Chlorine	yellow shoulder	1018	
Helium	brown shoulder	8008	
Hydrogen	red shoulder	3000	
Nitrous oxide	blue shoulder	5010	
Nitrogen	black shoulder	9005	previously grey in the UK
Oxygen	white shoulder	9010	previously black in the UK

==== Based on gas properties ====
Gas property	Colour	Examples
Toxic or corrosive	yellow shoulder	ammonia, chlorine, fluorine, arsine, carbon monoxide, sulfur dioxide
Flammable	red shoulder	hydrogen, methane, ethylene, forming gas
Oxidising	light blue shoulder	nitrous oxide, oxygen-containing blends
Inert (nontoxic, nonflammable, nonoxidising)	bright green	neon, krypton, xenon
Toxic and flammable or Toxic and corrosive	yellow and red shoulders (either two bands or quartered)	
Toxic and oxidising or Corrosive and oxidising	yellow and light blue shoulders (either two bands or quartered)	

==== Gas mixtures, mostly for diving ====
Diving cylinders are left unpainted (for aluminium), or painted to prevent corrosion (for steel), often in bright colors, most often fluorescent yellow, to increase visibility. This should not be confused with industrial gases, where a yellow shoulder means chlorine.

Gas	Colour	Alternative
Air	white and black quartered shoulder or white top and black band	
Nitrox mixture of nitrogen and oxygen	white and black quartered shoulder or white top and black band	green stripe on yellow bottom
Heliox mixture of helium and oxygen	white and brown quartered shoulder	
Trimix mixture of helium, nitrogen and oxygen	white, black and brown segmented shoulder	

== See also ==
- Diving cylinder – Container to supply high pressure breathing gas for divers
- Gas blending – Producing special gas mixtures to specification
- Industrial gas – Gaseous materials produced for use in industry
