= Carnot battery =

Energy storage system

A simplified scheme of a typical Carnot battery system

A Carnot battery (English: /kɑːrˈnoʊ/ kar-NOH, French: [kaʁno]) is a type of energy storage system that stores electricity in thermal energy storage. During the charging process, electricity is converted into heat and kept in heat storage. During the discharging process, the stored heat is converted back into electricity. The technology is also known as power-to-heat-to-power.

Fritz Marguerre patented the concept of this technology 100 years ago, but its development was recently revitalized, given the increased use of renewable energy and the need to increase the total recovered energy delivered from such sources. In this context, Andre Thess coined the term "Carnot battery" in 2018, prior to the first International Workshop on Carnot Batteries.

The term "Carnot battery" is derived from Carnot's theorem, which describes the maximum efficiency of conversion of heat energy into mechanical energy. The word "battery" indicates that the purpose of this technology is to store electricity. The discharge efficiency of Carnot batteries is limited by the Carnot efficiency. The concept of Carnot batteries covers technologies such as pumped thermal energy storage and liquid air energy storage.

== Background ==
In the transition to low-carbon energy systems, the penetration of variable renewable energy in electrical energy systems increases, thereby increasing the need for energy storage. Currently, most of the newly installed energy storage capacity comes from electrochemical batteries, such as lithium-ion batteries. This type of battery is suitable for short-term storage but may not be economical for longer durations due to its high energy density and associated costs. Thermal energy storage can store energy in inexpensive materials, such as water, rocks, and salts. Therefore, the cost for large-scale systems (e.g. gigawatt hours) can be lower than the cost of electrochemical batteries.

The German Aerospace Center (DLR) and University of Stuttgart have been working on the concept of Carnot batteries that store electricity in high-temperature heat storage since 2014. In 2018, the name "Carnot battery" was used at the Hannover Messe, one of the world's largest trade fairs, by DLR.

== System configuration ==
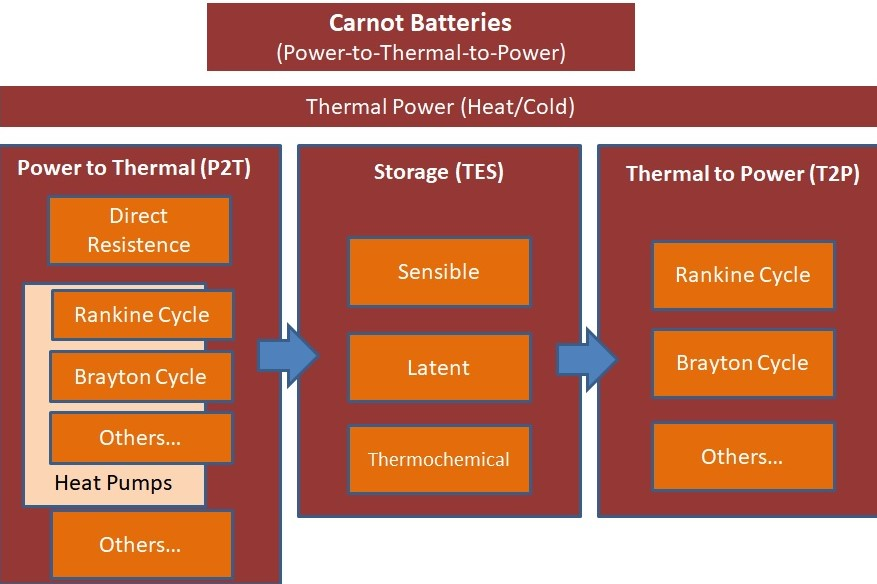
Possible energy conversion and storage technologies

A Carnot battery system can be divided into three parts: Power to Thermal (P2T), Thermal Energy Storage (TES), and Thermal to Power (T2P).

=== Electricity to heat technology ===
Electricity can be converted into heat through the use of various technologies.

- Resistive heating
- Heat pumps as the technology to pump heat from a lower temperature reservoir to a higher temperature. It can be divided into two groups: the reverse Rankine cycle and the reverse Brayton cycle.
  - The reverse Rankine cycle has been widely used in conventional heat pumps.
  - The concept of using the Brayton cycle for charging and discharging thermal energy was proposed by Prof. Robert B. Laughlin in 2017.
- Others: In liquid air energy storage systems, the Claude Cycle is used to liquify air. The Lamm–Honigmann process uses thermochemical cycles to convert power to heat.

=== Thermal energy storage ===
According to the mechanism to store heat, thermal energy storage can be divided into three types: sensible heat storage, latent heat storage, and thermochemical storage. The storage materials that have been used for Carnot batteries are:

- Hot water
- Molten salt
- Packed-bed rocks
- Liquid air
- Latent heat thermal energy storage
- Thermochemical materials (pairs of chemicals), such as LiBr/H_{2}O and H_{2}O/NH_{3}

=== Heat to electricity ===
Heat can be converted into power through thermodynamic cycles, such as the Rankine cycle or Brayton cycle. Some technologies use the property of semiconductor materials to convert heat into electricity, and those are not considered a Carnot battery because there are no thermodynamic cycles involved in the conversion process, such as thermoelectric materials and the "Sun in a box". The typical technologies are:

- Heat engines
- Steam turbines
- Gas turbines
- Organic Rankine cycle machines
- Lamm-Honigmann process can convert the stored energy in thermochemical storage into electricity.

These elements can be combined in many ways. An analysis of the combinations found an optimal design with 57% efficiency and an levelized cost of storage (LCOS) of €0.649 ($0.73)/kWh. Efficiency up to 81% is possible.

== Advantages and disadvantages ==
The Carnot battery is known by several other names such as Pumped Thermal Electricity Storage (PTES) or Pumped Heat Electricity Storage (PHES). This relatively new technology has become one of the large-scale energy storage technologies.

The main advantages of the Carnot battery are:

- Free choice of site;
- Small environmental footprint;
- Life expectancies of 20–30 years;
- Optional low-cost backup capacity;
- The components of an underutilized fossil-fueled power plant can be partially reused to build the Carnot batteries unit;

The major drawback of this technology is:

- The limited roundtrip efficiency 𝜂_{round}, which relates the electricity W_{dis} delivered during discharge to the electricity W_{char} needed to charge the system. Carnot batteries generally aim for a 40-70% efficiency range, significantly lower than pumped-storage hydroelectricity (65-85%).

== Application ==
Carnot batteries can be used as grid energy storage to store excess power from variable renewable energy sources and to produce electricity when needed.

Some Carnot battery systems can use the stored heat or cold for other applications, such as district heating and cooling for data centers.

Carnot batteries have been proposed as a solution to convert existing coal-fired power plants into a fossil fuel-free generation system by replacing the coal fueled boiler. The existing facilities in power plants such as power generation systems and transmission systems can be used.

== List of Carnot battery projects ==
Although the term Carnot battery is new, many existing technologies can be classified as Carnot batteries.

- Liquid air energy storage: Highview Power, University of Birmingham
- Liquid carbon dioxide energy storage: Energy Dome, based in Milan
- Pumped thermal energy storage: Malta Inc., University of Durham
- Electric thermal energy storage: Siemens Gamesa, National Renewable Energy Laboratory
- Reversible heat pump / ORC: University of Liège
- Lamm-Honigmann energy storage: Technische Universität Berlin
- Carnot battery research: Czech Technical University in Prague - UCEEB

== See also ==
- Energy storage
- Grid energy storage
- Thermal energy storage
