= Energy Dome (company) =

Italian phase-change energy storage company

logo of Energy Dome S.p.a.

Energy Dome S.p.A. is an Italian company based in Milan that is developing a range of phase-change Carnot battery systems. Their technology is similar to that used in liquid air energy storage systems, but based on carbon dioxide, which cycles between a liquid form in storage containers and gaseous form in sealed inflatable balloon structures in fixed locations. The system uses a Rankine-like cycle, in which a water tank is used to store the thermal energy released during gas liquefaction that will later be used to re-heat the liquid gas to ambient temperature and pressure to drive a turbine to generate electricity.

As of 2025, the company has built a demonstration pilot plant in Sardinia. In 2025, they partnered with Google to develop long-term energy storage systems intended to let Google rely on renewable energy to power their data centers.

A theoretical study shows their system to have a volumetric energy density of 0.17 kWh/m^{3}, with an areal energy storage footprint of 235–250 m^{2}/MWh. Another theoretical study shows the system having an estimated round-trip energy efficiency of 77%.
