= Liquid air (disambiguation) =

Liquid air is air that has been cooled to very low temperatures.

Liquid air may also refer to:

- Liquid Air, was an early automobile
- Liquid Air (EP), is an EP by German band Air Liquide

== See also ==
- Air Liquide, a company supplying industrial gases
- Air Liquide (band), is a German band
  - Air Liquide (album), is an album by Air Liquide
