= Johnny Stenbäck =

Finnish software engineer

Johnny Stenbäck is a Finnish software engineer mostly known for his work on the Mozilla browser. He was one of the first developers outside Netscape to get involved with the Mozilla source released by Netscape in March 1998. Stenbäck started working on the source code soon after the release, then working for the Finnish software company Citec (Citec created DocZilla, a Mozilla-based SGML browser). In 2000 he was hired by Netscape and moved to California. In 2003 Stenbäck joined the Mozilla Foundation.

Stenbäck is currently working at Google.

== Publications ==
- Co-author of "Extending Mozilla or How to Do the Impossible", which was originally prepared as a tutorial for Xtech'99.
- Editor of Document Object Model (DOM) Level 2 HTML Specification, a W3C Recommendation.
