= Highview =

Highview or High View may refer to:

== Places ==
- Highview, Louisville, Kentucky, U.S.
- High View, West Virginia, U.S.

== Other uses ==
- Highview Power, a company specialized in cryogenic energy storage
- Highview Productions, an Australian film production company
