= Liquid air =

Air that has been condensed into a liquid

Liquid air is air that has been cooled to very low temperatures (cryogenic temperatures), so that it has condensed into a pale blue mobile liquid. It is stored in specialized containers, such as vacuum flasks, to insulate it from room temperature. Liquid air can absorb heat rapidly and revert to its gaseous state. It is often used for condensing other substances into liquid and/or solidifying them, and as an industrial source of nitrogen, oxygen, argon, and other inert gases through a process called air separation (industrially referred to as air rectification).

== Properties ==
Liquid air has a density of approximately 870 kg/m^{3} (870 g/L; 0.87 g/cm^{3}). The density of a given air sample varies depending on the composition of that sample (e.g., humidity & CO_{2} concentration). Since dry gaseous air contains approximately 78% nitrogen, 21% oxygen, and 1% argon, the density of liquid air at standard composition is calculated by the percentage of the components and their respective liquid densities (see liquid nitrogen and liquid oxygen). Although air contains trace amounts of carbon dioxide (about 0.0425%), carbon dioxide solidifies from the gas phase without passing through the intermediate liquid phase, and hence will not be present in liquid air at pressures less than 5.1 atm (520 kPa).

The boiling point of air is 78.80 K (−194.35 °C; −317.83 °F), intermediate between the boiling points of liquid nitrogen and liquid oxygen. However, it can be difficult to maintain a stable temperature as the liquid boils, since nitrogen will boil off first, leaving the mixture oxygen-rich and altering the boiling point. This may also occur in some circumstances due to liquid air condensing oxygen from the atmosphere.

Liquid air starts to freeze at approximately 60 K (−213.2 °C; −351.7 °F), precipitating nitrogen-rich solid (but with an appreciable amount of oxygen in solid solution). Unless the oxygen is previously accommodated in the solid solution, the eutectic freezes at 50 K (−223.2 °C; −369.7 °F).

== Preparation ==
=== Principle of production ===
The constituents of air were once known as "permanent gases" because they could not be liquefied solely by compression at room temperature. A compression process will raise the temperature of the gas. This heat is removed by cooling to ambient temperature in a heat exchanger, then expanding by venting into a chamber. The expansion lowers the temperature, and through counter-flow heat exchange with the expanded air, the pressurized air entering the expander is further cooled. With sufficient compression, flow, and heat removal, droplets of liquid air will eventually form, which may then be used directly for low-temperature demonstrations.

The main constituents of air were liquefied for the first time by Polish scientists Karol Olszewski and Zygmunt Wróblewski in 1883.

=== Process of production ===
The most common process for the preparation of liquid air is the two-column Hampson–Linde cycle using the Joule–Thomson effect. Air is fed at high pressure (>75 atm (7,600 kPa; 1,100 psi)) into the lower column, in which it is separated into pure nitrogen and oxygen-rich liquid. The rich liquid and some of the nitrogen are fed as reflux into the upper column, which operates at low pressure (<25 atm (2,500 kPa; 370 psi)), where the final separation into pure nitrogen and oxygen occurs. A raw argon product can be removed from the middle of the upper column for further purification.

Air can also be liquefied by Claude's process, which combines cooling by Joule–Thomson effect, isentropic expansion and regenerative cooling.

== Application ==
In manufacturing processes, the liquid air product is typically fractionated into its constituent gases in either liquid or gaseous form, as the oxygen is especially useful for fuel gas welding and cutting and for medical use, and the argon is useful as an oxygen-excluding shielding gas in gas tungsten arc welding. Liquid nitrogen is useful in various low-temperature applications, being nonreactive at normal temperatures (unlike oxygen), and boiling at 77 K (−196 °C; −321 °F).

=== Transport and energy storage ===
Between 1899 and 1902, the Liquid Air Power and Automobile Co. produced and demonstrated an automobile, Liquid Air, which the company claimed could run a hundred miles on liquid air.

On 2 October 2012, the Institution of Mechanical Engineers said that liquid air could be used to store energy. This was based on a technology that was developed by Peter Dearman, a garage inventor in Hertfordshire, England, to power vehicles.

== See also ==
- Liquid nitrogen
- Liquid oxygen
- Cryogenic energy storage
- Industrial gas
- Liquefaction of gases
- Liquid nitrogen vehicle
