= Hydrogen turboexpander-generator =

A hydrogen turboexpander-generator or generator-loaded expander for hydrogen gas is an axial flow turbine or radial expander for energy recovery through which a high pressure hydrogen gas is expanded to produce work used to drive an electrical generator. It replaces the control valve or regulator where the pressure drops to the appropriate pressure for the low-pressure network. A turboexpander generator can help recover energy losses and offset electrical requirements and CO_{2} emissions.

== Description ==
Per stage, 200 bar is handled with up to 15,000 kW power and a maximum expansion ratio of 14, the generator loaded expander for hydrogen gas is fitted with an automatic thrust balance, a dry gas seal, and a programmable logic control with remote monitoring and diagnostics.

== Application ==
Hydrogen turboexpander-generators are used for hydrogen pipeline transport in combination with hydrogen compressors and energy recovery in underground hydrogen storage. A variation is the compressor loaded turboexpanders which are used in the liquefaction of gases such as liquid hydrogen.

== See also ==
- Compressed hydrogen
- Hydrogen infrastructure
