= Lamm-Honigmann process =

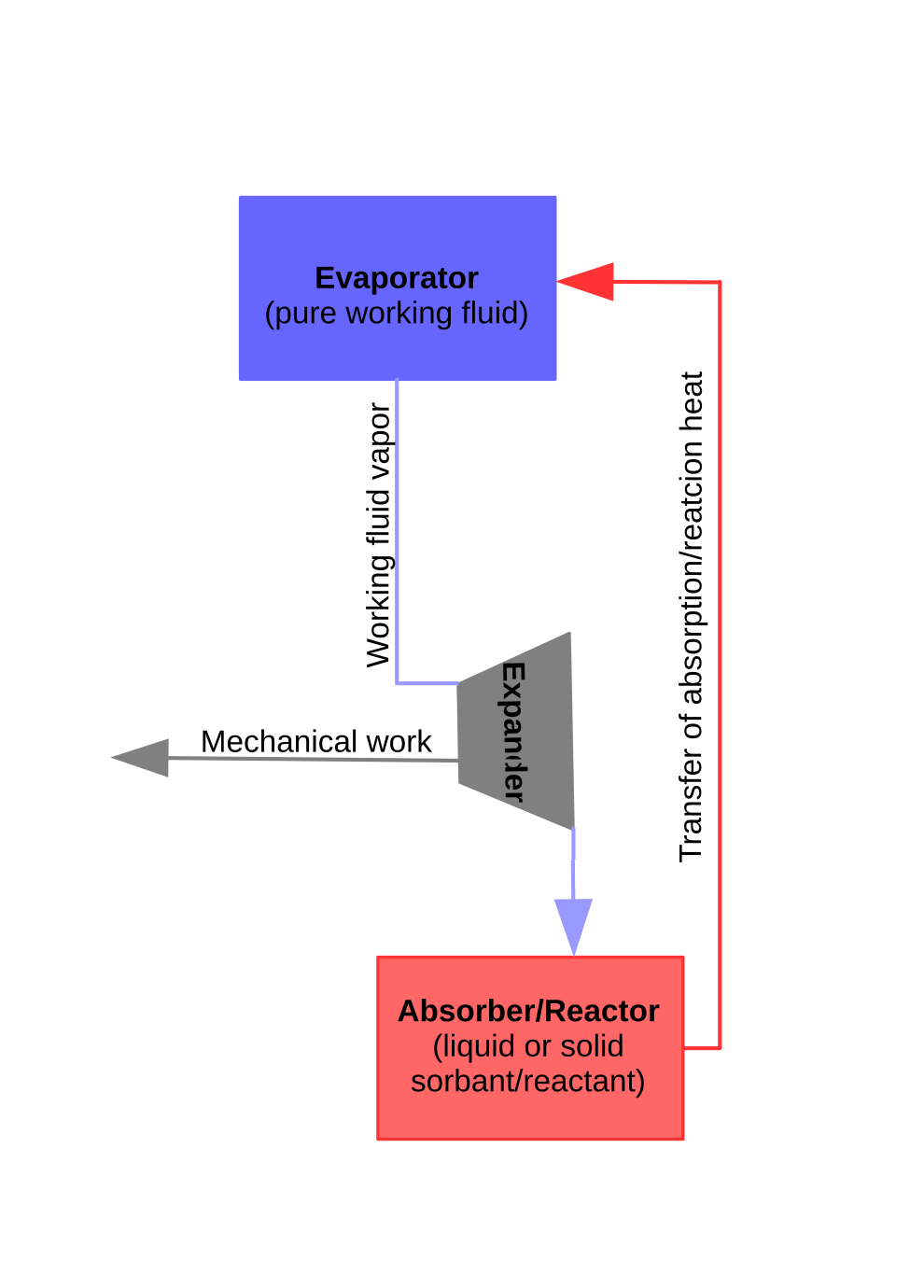
Schematic of the discharging process of a Lamm-Honigmann thermochemical energy storage.

The Lamm-Honigmann process is a storage and heat to power conversion process that consists of using the effect of vapor pressure depression of a working fluid mixture compared to a pure working fluid of that mixture. This process is named after their independent inventors Emile Lamm (US patent from 1870) and Moritz Honigmann (German patent from 1883). Both inventors envisioned and realized the same process principle for usage as energy storage in so-called Fireless locomotive but with different working fluid pairs: Emile Lamm used ammonia and water, Moritz Honigmann used water and caustic soda.

Compared to conventional fire-less locomotives (that usually work with reservoirs of pure pressurized water or air) the advantage of the process proposed by Lamm and Honigmann is that the loss in pressure ratio during discharging of the storage is smaller, and therefore theoretically a larger storage density can be achieved. The process can be considered as a Carnot battery technologies.

== Process principle ==
A mixture of water and e.g. any salt has according to Raoult's law a smaller vapor pressure than the pure mixture. More specifically, the vapor pressure depression is larger the larger the salt mass fraction is. This pressure potential is used in the Lamm-Honigmann process to expand the working fluid, e.g. water vapor, in an expansion device and generate mechanical or subsequently electrical energy. The working fluid is evaporated from a reservoir (Evaporator) and then expanded into a concentrated solution of the working fluid pair that has lower vapor pressure (Absorber). The working fluid is absorbed by the solution and heat of absorption is transferred to the evaporator to hold the pressure in the evaporator. During this discharging process the pressure in the absorber is rising due to dilution of the mixture, until the pressure potential is not large enough anymore to drive the expansion device or whatever is connected to it. The storage is discharged.

The charging process consists of re-concentrating the working fluid mixture by means of heat or mechanical energy. In the case of thermal charging, the diluted solution is heated and the working fluid is desorbed and condensed in a condenser at the same pressure level. The heat of condensation has to be transferred to the environment or another heat sink. In case of mechanical charging the discharging process is literally inverted. A compression device brings the working fluid that is desorbed out of the mixture to a larger pressure level, where it is condensed. The heat of condensation is transferred to the mixture for desorption of the working fluid.

The process can equally be realized using solid sorption pairs (e.g. Zeolith/water) or chemicals of a reversible chemical reaction (e.g. Calcium chloride/water), but no realized prototypes are known.

== Application as stationary energy storage ==
Whereas the storage densities achievable with the recently investigated working fluid pairs are with 1.4–17.5 Wh/kg not large enough for mobile applications, current research work focuses on its application as stationary energy storage with a flexible use of different kinds of energy for charging and discharging as indicated storage efficiencies are comparable to other bulk energy storage systems such as pumped hydro, liquid air energy storage or hydrogen storage.

== See also ==
- Energy storage
- Grid energy storage
- Carnot battery
- Thermal energy storage
