= Liquid nitrogen cocktail =

Drinks with liquid nitrogen

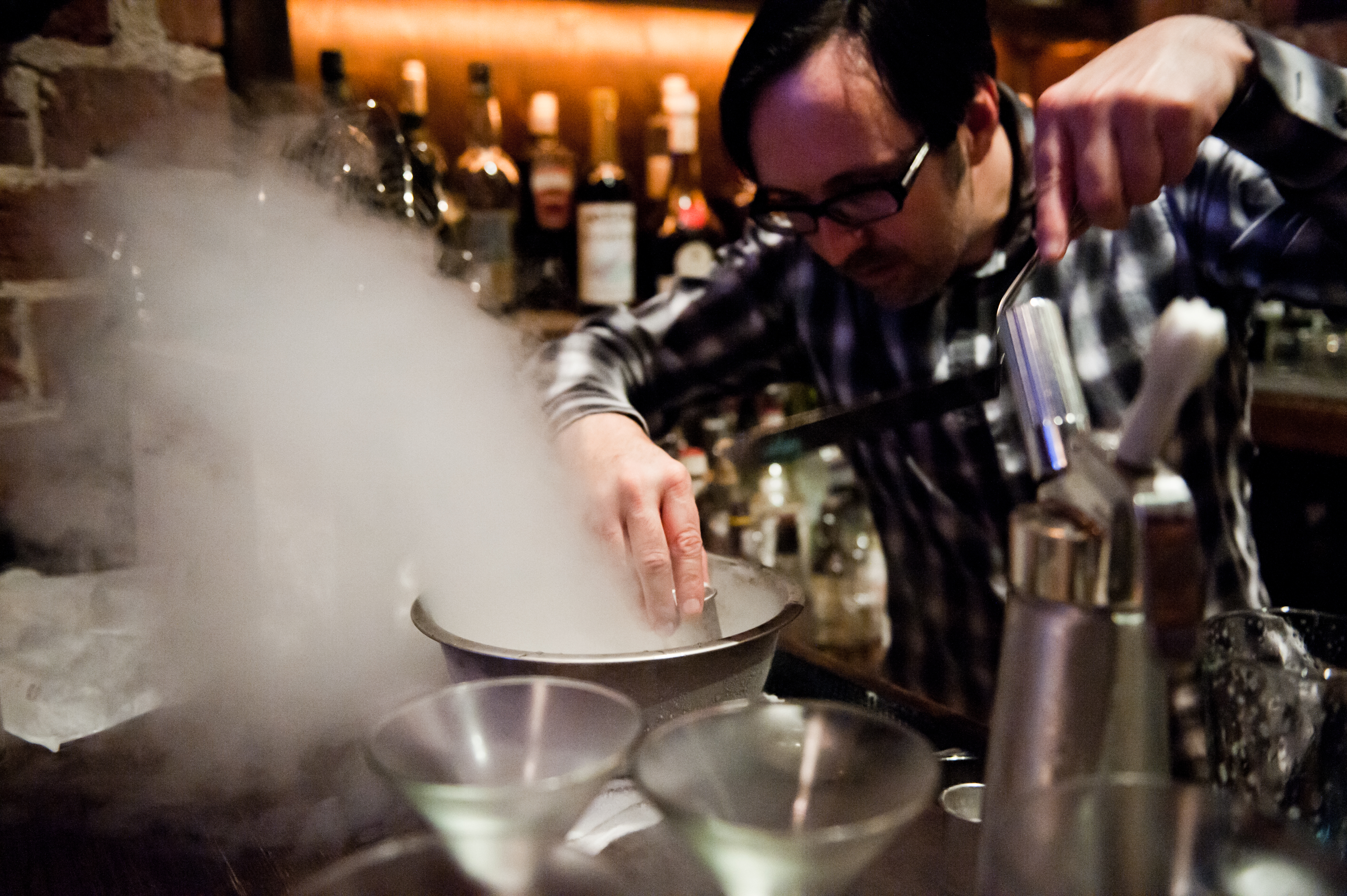
A bartender making a liquid nitrogen cocktail

A liquid nitrogen cocktail is any mixed drink whose preparation involves the use of liquid nitrogen. Popularized as a novelty because of the smoky, bubbling "cauldron effect" it produces, liquid nitrogen is controversial as a cocktail ingredient because it boils at −196 °C (77 K; −321 °F) and its consumption is thus potentially lethal. However, it is not a regulated substance in most countries and there is little control of its use.

== History ==
The culinary use of liquid nitrogen is mentioned in an 1890 recipe book titled Fancy Ices by Agnes Marshall, but has been employed in more recent times by restaurants in the preparation of frozen desserts, such as liquid nitrogen ice cream, which can be created within moments at the table because of the speed at which it cools food. Similarly, liquid nitrogen has become popular in the preparation of cocktails because it can be used to quickly chill glasses or freeze ingredients. It is also added to drinks to create a smoky effect, which is created by the cold nitrogen vapour (liquid nitrogen boils at −195.8 °C at normal atmospheric pressure) condensing the moisture in the surrounding air above.

== Safety concerns ==
Because of its low temperature, liquid nitrogen can be extremely damaging to body tissue, causing frostbite and cryogenic burning on contact. If ingested, it can lead to severe internal damage, destroying tissue in the mouth and digestive tract. Furthermore, as it evaporates, liquid nitrogen releases a large volume of gas, which means it can burst the stomach if swallowed in a sufficiently large amount.

=== Lancaster incident ===
The potential danger of liquid nitrogen cocktails was highlighted by an incident that occurred in the United Kingdom in October 2012. On 4 October, an 18-year-old woman named Gaby Scanlon was admitted to hospital with severe abdominal pain and shortness of breath after drinking a cocktail prepared with liquid nitrogen while celebrating her birthday at a bar in Lancaster city centre. A medical team diagnosed her condition as perforated stomach, and performed a gastrectomy to save her life. On September 17, 2015, Oscar's Wine Bar and Bistro in Lancaster was fined £100,000 as a result of the incident, as no proper risk assessment had been performed and bar staff had not received adequate warnings of the importance of not drinking the cocktail until all the nitrogen had boiled off.

The incident prompted representatives of the British Compressed Gases Association and the Food Standards Agency to warn the public of the dangers of consuming the liquid. An investigation was also launched, headed by Lancashire Police, who said that the establishment concerned had removed liquid nitrogen cocktails from its menu. On 12 October, The Guardian reported that David Morris, the MP for Morecambe and Lunesdale, had written to the Food Standards Agency and the Secretary of State for Health, calling for the sale of drinks containing liquid nitrogen to be banned. He also planned to table an early day motion in the House of Commons on the issue.

The New South Wales Office of Liquor, Gaming and Racing, which oversees licensed premises in the Australian state of New South Wales issued an immediate moratorium on the use of liquid nitrogen while an investigation was carried out into its use.
