= P2H2P =

P2H2P can mean:

- Power-to-heat-to-power, see Carnot battery
- Power-to-hydrogen-to-power, see Green hydrogen
