= Highview Power =

English energy storage company

- Company type: Private
- Industry: Energy storage
- Headquarters: London, England
- Key people: Colin Roy (Chairman); Richard Butland (CEO)
- Website: www.highviewpower.com

Highview Power is a long-duration energy storage pioneer, specialising in liquid air energy storage (LAES). LAES stores excess renewable energy by cooling air to a liquid and then converting back to renewable energy when there is demand from the grid.

It is based in England, with an office in Central London with international offices in North Sydney, Australia, Dubai and Chennai, India.

In June 2024 Highview Power secured the backing of the UK Infrastructure Bank and the energy industry leader Centrica with a £300 million investment for the first commercial-scale liquid air energy storage (LAES) plant in the UK.

The £300 million funding round was led by the UK Infrastructure Bank and the British multinational energy and services company Centrica, alongside a syndicate of investors including Rio Tinto, Goldman Sachs, Kirkbi and Mosaic Capital.

The investment will enable the construction of one of the world’s largest long duration energy storage (LDES) facilities in Carrington, Greater Manchester, using Highview Power’s proprietary LAES technology. Once complete, it will have a storage capacity of 300 MWh and an output power of 50 MW for six hours. Construction will begin on the site immediately, with the facility operational in early 2026, supporting over 700 jobs in construction and the supply chain.

== Technology ==
Its CRYOBattery™ technology uses low-cost electricity to cool air to -196 °C, reducing it to a liquid 1/700th the volume. At times of high demand for electricity, when prices are typically high, the liquid is expanded through a turbine to generate electricity, free of combustion and the resultant emissions. The process can utilise waste heat and waste cold to boost efficiency. The system utilises standard equipment from sectors like Liquified Natural Gas and, unlike short-duration energy storage technologies (like thermochemical batteries), doesn't require mining for, or complex recycling of, rare minerals.

== Awards ==
- Ashden Award for Energy Innovation
- Global Frost & Sullivan Award for Technology Innovation
- The Engineer Innovation Award

== Partners ==
=== Academic ===
- Centre for Cryogenic Energy Storage, University of Birmingham
- University of Brighton
- University of Leeds

=== Industry ===
- BOC
- Citec
- General Electric
- Linde
- Messer
- Tenaska
- Viridor

== See also ==
- Cryogenic energy storage
