= Regenerative cooling =

Technique for cooling gases

Regenerative cooling is a method of cooling gases in which compressed gas is cooled by allowing it to expand and thereby take heat from the surroundings. The cooled expanded gas then passes through a heat exchanger where it cools the incoming compressed gas.

== Regenerative cycles ==
- Stirling cycle
- Gifford–McMahon cycle
- Vuilleumier cycle
- Pulse tube refrigerator

== History ==
In 1857, Siemens introduced the regenerative cooling concept with the Siemens cycle. In 1895, William Hampson in England and Carl von Linde in Germany independently developed and patented the Hampson–Linde cycle to liquefy air using the Joule–Thomson expansion process and regenerative cooling. On 10 May 1898, James Dewar used regenerative cooling to become the first to statically liquefy hydrogen.

== See also ==
- Cryocooler
- Displacer
- Fluid mechanics
- Regenerative cooling (rocket)
- Regenerative heat exchanger
- Thermodynamic cycle
- Timeline of hydrogen technologies
