= Cryogenic energy storage =

Use of low temperature liquids to store energy

Cryogenic energy storage (CES) is the use of low temperature (cryogenic) liquids such as liquid air or liquid nitrogen to store energy. The technology is primarily used for the large-scale storage of electricity.

== Grid energy storage ==
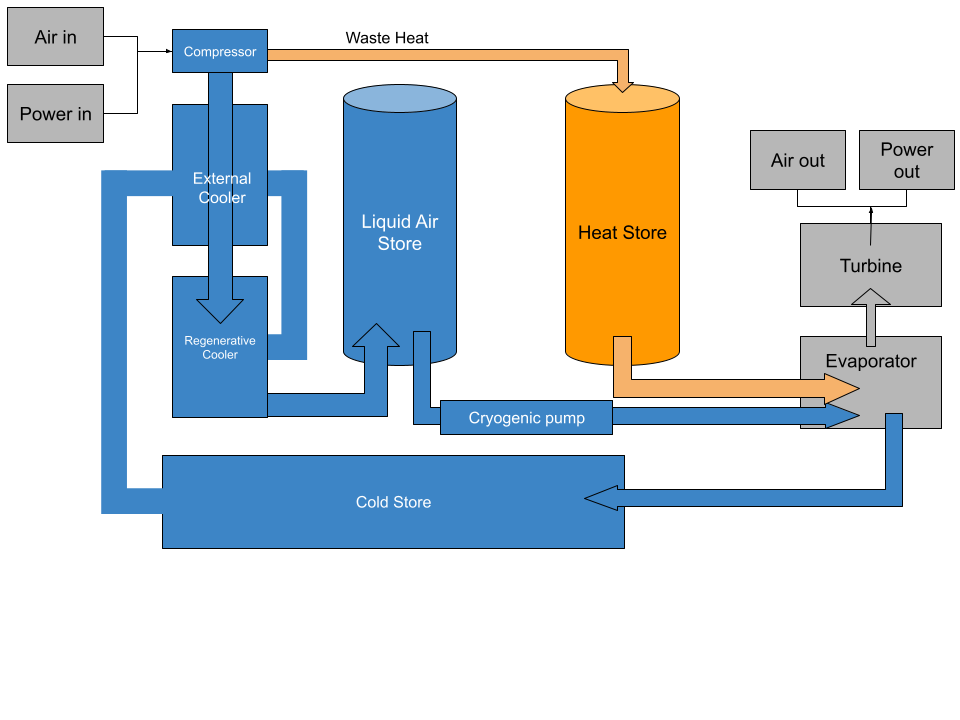
Diagram of a Cryogenic energy storage system. Arrows show the flow of air and heat through the system.

=== Process ===
When it is cheaper (usually at night), electricity is used to cool air from the atmosphere to -195 °C using the Claude Cycle to the point where it liquefies. The liquid air, which takes up one-thousandth of the volume of the gas, can be kept for a long time in a large vacuum flask at atmospheric pressure. At times of high demand for electricity, the liquid air is pumped at high pressure into a heat exchanger, which acts as a boiler. Air from the atmosphere at ambient temperature, or hot water from an industrial heat source, is used to heat the liquid and turn it back into a gas. The massive increase in volume and pressure from this is used to drive a turbine to generate electricity.

=== Efficiency ===
In isolation, the process is only 25% efficient. This is increased to around 50% when used with a low-grade cold store, such as a large gravel bed, to capture the cold generated by evaporating the cryogen. The cold is re-used during the next refrigeration cycle.

Efficiency is further increased when used in conjunction with a power plant or other source of low-grade heat that would otherwise be lost to the atmosphere. Highview Power claims an AC to AC round-trip efficiency of 70%, by using an otherwise waste heat source from the compressor and other process wasted low grade heat at 115 °C with the IMechE (Institution of Mechanical Engineers) agreeing these efficiency estimates for a commercial-scale plant are realistic. However this number was not checked or confirmed by independent professional institutions.

=== Advantages ===
The system is based on proven technology, used safely in many industrial processes, and does not require any particularly rare elements or expensive components to manufacture. Dr Tim Fox, the head of Energy at the IMechE says "It uses standard industrial components - which reduces commercial risk; it will last for decades and it can be fixed with a spanner."

=== Applications ===
==== Economics ====
The technology is only economic where there is large variation in the wholesale price of electricity over time. Typically this will be where it is difficult to vary generation in response to changing demand. The technology thus complements growing energy sources like wind and solar, and allows a greater penetration of such renewables into the energy mix. It is less useful where electricity is mostly provided by dispatchable generation, like coal or gas-fired thermal plants, or hydro-electricity.

Cryogenic plants can also provide grid services, including grid balancing, voltage support, frequency response and synchronous inertia.

==== Locations ====
Unlike other grid-scale energy storage technologies which require specific geographies such as mountain reservoirs (pumped-storage hydropower) or underground salt caverns (compressed-air energy storage), a cryogenic energy storage plant can be located just about anywhere.

To achieve the greatest efficiencies, a cryogenic plant should be located near a source of low-grade heat which would otherwise be lost to the atmosphere. Often this would be a thermal power station that could be expected to be also generating electricity at times of peak demand and the highest prices. Colocation with a source of unused cold, such as an LNG regasification facility is also an advantage.

== Grid-scale demonstrators ==
=== United Kingdom ===
In April 2014, the UK government announced it had given £8 million to Viridor and Highview Power to fund the next stage of the demonstration. The resulting grid-scale demonstrator plant at Pilsworth Landfill facility in Bury, Greater Manchester, UK, started operation in April 2018. The design was based on research by the Birmingham Centre for Cryogenic Energy Storage (BCCES) associated with the University of Birmingham, and has storage for up to 15 MWh, and can generate a peak supply of 5 MW (so when fully charged lasts for three hours at maximum output) and is designed for an operational life of 40 years.

=== United States ===
In 2019, the Washington State Department of Commerce's Clean Energy Fund announced it would provide a grant to help Tacoma Power partner with Praxair to build a 15 MW / 450 MWh liquid air energy storage plant. It will store up to 850,000 gallons of liquid nitrogen to help balance power loads.

== Commercial plants ==
Following grid-scale demonstrator plants, a 250 MWh commercial plant is under construction in the UK, and a 400 MWh store is planned in the USA.

=== United Kingdom ===
In October 2019, Highview Power announced that it planned to build a 50 MW / 250 MWh commercial plant in Carrington, Greater Manchester. Construction began in November 2020, with commercial operation planned for 2022. At 250 MWh, the plant could have matched the storage capacity of the world's largest lithium-ion battery at the time, the Gateway Energy Storage facility in California. In November 2022 Highview Power stated that they were still trying to raise money "to construct a storage plant in Carrington that has a 30 megawatts capacity and can store 300 megawatt hours of electricity" with commissioning planned for "the end of 2024."

In 2024, Highview Power announced it had raised £300 million investments the UK Infrastructure Bank and Centrica and would begin immediate construction of a 50MW/300MWh facility at Carrington. Commercial operation is planned to start in early 2026.

=== United States ===
In December 2019, Highview announced plans to build a 50 MW plant in northern Vermont, with the proposed facility able to store eight hours of energy, for a 400 MWh storage capacity.

=== Chile ===
In June 2021, Highview announced that it was developing a 50MW / 500MWh storage plant in the Atacama region of Chile.

=== China ===
A 60 MW / 600 MWh (10 hour) facility started operating in the Gobi Desert in late 2025.

== History ==
=== Transport ===
Both liquid air and liquid nitrogen have been used experimentally to power cars. A liquid air powered car called Liquid Air was built between 1899 and 1902 but it couldn't at the time compete in terms of efficiency with other engines.

More recently, a liquid nitrogen vehicle was built. Peter Dearman, a garage inventor in Hertfordshire, UK who had initially developed a liquid air powered car, then put the technology to use as grid energy storage The Dearman engine differs from former nitrogen engine designs in that the nitrogen is heated by combining it with the heat exchange fluid inside the cylinder of the engine.

=== Electricity storage pilots ===
In 2010, the technology was piloted at a UK power station. A 300 kW, 2.5 MWh storage capacity pilot cryogenic energy system developed by researchers at the University of Leeds and Highview Power that uses liquid air (with the CO_{2} and water removed as they would turn solid at the storage temperature) as the energy store, and low-grade waste heat to boost the thermal re-expansion of the air, operated at an 80 MW biomass power station in Slough, UK, from 2010 until 2014 when it was relocated to the university of Birmingham. The efficiency is less than 15% because of low efficiency hardware components used, but the engineers are targeting an efficiency of about 60 percent for the next generation of CES based on operation experiences of this system.

== See also ==
- United States Department of Energy International Energy Storage Database
