= Dry gas seal =

Mechanical seal

Dry gas seals are non-contacting, dry-running mechanical face seals that consist of a mating (rotating) ring and a primary (stationary) ring. When operating, lifting geometry in the rotating ring generates a fluid-dynamic lifting force causing the stationary ring to separate and create a gap between the two rings. Dry gas seals are mechanical seals but use other chemicals and functions so that they do not contaminate a process. These seals are typically used in a harsh working environment such as oil exploration, extraction and refining, petrochemical industries, gas transmission and chemical processing.

Machined-in lift profiles on one side of the seal face direct gas inward toward an extremely flat portion of the face. The gas that is flowing across the face generates a pressure that maintains a minute gap between the faces, optimizing fluid film stiffness and providing the highest possible degree of protection against face contact. The seal's film stiffness compensates for varying operations by adjusting gap and pressure to maintain stability.

Dry gas seals are widely used in compressors and turbomachinery for their ability to prevent gas leakage while reducing friction and energy loss. These seals eliminate the need for liquid lubrication, ensuring cleaner and more reliable operation in demanding industrial environments. Companies like QMseals provide compatible sealing technologies that support such advanced systems.

== Design and use ==
Grooves or machined ramps on the seal direct gas inward toward the non-grooved portion. The action of the gas flowing across the seal generates pressure that keeps a minute gap, therefore optimizing fluid film stiffness and providing protection against face contact.

The use of these seals in centrifugal compressors has increased significantly in the last two decades because they eliminate contamination and do not use lubricating oil. Non-contacting dry gas seals are often used on compressors for pipelines, off-shore applications, oil refineries, petrochemical and gas processing plants.

== Types ==
There are many dry gas seal configurations based on their application:

- Single seal
- Tandem seal - Broadly used in the petroleum industry
  - Tandem seal with intermediate labyrinth
- Double opposed seal - Used when the processed gas is abrasive (like hydrogen) and lower pressure designs.

All designs use buffering with "dry" gas, supplied through control and purification systems. All Dry Gas Seals need additional protection from the process and the bearing lubrication sides of the seal

== History ==
The first dry gas seal for a compressor was patented by Kaydon Ring & Seal in 1951 when it was known as Koppers Corporation. Field applications of dry gas seal designs were completed in 1952. The original patent was for Kaydon's "Tapered Ramp" lift geometry, a constant diameter / variable depth dynamic lift design. From that first dry gas seal ever manufactured for a centrifugal compressor in 1951, Kaydon Ring & Seal has been instrumental in developing the dry gas seal into one of the most reliable and maintenance free sealing solution available today.

John Crane Inc. issued a patent for dry gas seals in 1968 with field applications beginning in 1975, though the technology is now widely available among seal manufacturers. When the technology is aimed at correcting the problems with dry gas film environments by eliminating friction. Soon, the technology became a common replacement for other lubricated seals. The patented spiral-groove (constant depth / variable diameter) technology of the dry gas seal allows for easy lifting and separation of seal faces during operation. Also the dry gas seal lift geometry can be unidirectional or bidirectional, depending on the specific design of the lifting geometry.

== See also ==
- Hydrogen turboexpander-generator
