= Siemens cycle =

Gas cooling and liquefaction technique

The Siemens cycle is a technique used to cool or liquefy gases. A gas is compressed, leading to an increase in its temperature due to the directly proportional relationship between temperature and pressure (as stated by Gay-Lussac's law). The compressed gas is then cooled by a heat exchanger and decompressed, resulting in a (possibly condensed) gas that is colder than the original at the same pressure.

Carl Wilhelm Siemens patented the Siemens cycle in 1857.

In the Siemens cycle the gas is:

1. Heated – by compressing the gas – adding external energy into the gas, to give it what is needed for running through the cycle
2. Cooled – by immersing the gas in a cooler environment, losing some of its heat (and energy)
3. Cooled through heat exchanger with returning gas from next (and last stage)
4. Cooled further by expanding the gas and doing work, removing heat (and energy)

The gas which is now at its coolest in the current cycle, is recycled and sent back to be –

5. Heated – when participating as the coolant for stage 3, and then
6. Resent to stage one, to start the next cycle, and be slightly reheated by compression.

In each cycle the net cooling is more than the heat added at the beginning of the cycle. As the gas passes more cycles and becomes cooler, reaching lower temperatures at the expanding cylinder (stage 4 of the Siemens cycle) becomes more difficult.

== See also ==
- Adiabatic process
- Gas compressor
- Hampson–Linde cycle
- Regenerative cooling
- Timeline of low-temperature technology
