= Liquid nitrogen engine =

A liquid nitrogen engine is powered by liquid nitrogen, which is stored in a tank. Traditional nitrogen engine designs work by heating the liquid nitrogen in a heat exchanger, extracting heat from the ambient air and using the resulting pressurized gas to operate a piston or rotary motor. Vehicles propelled by liquid nitrogen have been demonstrated, but are not used commercially. One such vehicle, Liquid Air, was demonstrated in 1902.

Liquid nitrogen propulsion may also be incorporated in hybrid systems, e.g., battery electric propulsion and fuel tanks to recharge the batteries. This kind of system is called a hybrid liquid nitrogen-electric propulsion. Additionally, regenerative braking can also be used in conjunction with this system.

One advantage of the liquid nitrogen vehicle is that the exhaust gas is simply nitrogen, a component of air, and thus it produces no localized air pollution in the tailpipe emissions. This does not make it completely pollution free, since energy had been required to liquefy the nitrogen in the first place, but that liquification process can be remote from the vehicle operation, and could in principle be powered by a renewable energy or clean energy source.

== Description ==
Liquid nitrogen is generated by cryogenic or reversed Stirling engine coolers that liquefy the main component of air, nitrogen (N_{2}). The cooler can be powered by electricity or through direct mechanical work from hydro or wind turbines. Liquid nitrogen is distributed and stored in insulated containers. The insulation reduces heat flow into the stored nitrogen; this is necessary because heat from the surrounding environment boils the liquid, which then transitions to a gaseous state. Reducing inflowing heat reduces the loss of liquid nitrogen in storage. The requirements of storage prevent the use of pipelines as a means of transport. Since long-distance pipelines would be costly due to the insulation requirements, it would be costly to use distant energy sources for production of liquid nitrogen. Petroleum reserves are typically a vast distance from consumption but can be transferred at ambient temperatures.

Liquid nitrogen consumption is in essence production in reverse. The Stirling engine or cryogenic heat engine offers a way to power vehicles and a means to generate electricity. Liquid nitrogen can also serve as a direct coolant for refrigerators, electrical equipment and air conditioning units. The consumption of liquid nitrogen is in effect boiling and returning the nitrogen to the atmosphere.

In the Dearman Engine the nitrogen is heated by combining it with the heat exchange fluid inside the cylinder of the engine.

In 2008, the US Patent Office granted a patent on a liquid nitrogen powered turbine engine. The turbine flash-expands liquid nitrogen that is sprayed into the high-pressure section of the turbine, and the expanding gas is combined with incoming pressurized air to produce a high-velocity stream of gas that is ejected from the back of the turbine. The resulting gas stream can be used to drive generators or other devices. The system has not been demonstrated to power electric generators of greater than 1 kW, however higher output may be possible.

=== Carnot Cycle ===
Although the liquid nitrogen is colder than the ambient temperature, the liquid nitrogen engine is nevertheless an example of a heat engine. A heat engine runs by extracting thermal energy from the temperature difference between a hot and a cold reservoir; in the case of the liquid nitrogen engine, the "hot" reservoir is the air in the ambient ("room temperature") surroundings, which is used to boil the nitrogen.

As such, the nitrogen engine is extracting energy from the thermal energy of the air, and the conversion efficiency with which it converts energy can be calculated from the laws of thermodynamics using Carnot efficiency equation, which applies to all heat engines.

=== Tanks ===
The tanks to store the liquid nitrogen must be designed to safety standards appropriate for a pressure vessel, such as ISO 11439.

The storage tank may be made of:

- steel
- aluminium
- carbon fiber
- Kevlar
- other materials, or combinations of the above.

The fiber materials are considerably lighter than metals but generally more expensive. Metal tanks can withstand a large number of pressure cycles, but must be checked for corrosion periodically. Liquid nitrogen, LN2, is commonly transported in insulated tanks, up to 50 litres, at atmospheric pressure. These tanks, being non-pressurized tanks, are not subject to inspection. Very large tanks for LN2 are sometimes pressurized to less than 25 psi to aid in transferring the liquid at point of use.

== Liquid nitrogen vehicles ==
A vehicle propelled by liquid nitrogen, the Liquid Air, was demonstrated in 1902.

In June 2016 trials will begin in London, UK on supermarket J. Sainsbury's fleet of food delivery vehicles: using a Dearman nitrogen engine to provide power for the cooling of food cargo when the vehicle is stationary and the main engine is off. Currently delivery lorries mostly have second smaller diesel engines to power cooling when the main engine is off.

=== Emission output ===
Like other non-combustion energy storage technologies, a liquid nitrogen vehicle displaces the emission source from the vehicle's tail pipe to the central electrical generating plant. Where emissions-free sources are available, net production of pollutants can be reduced. Emission control measures at a central generating plant may be more effective and less costly than treating the emissions of widely dispersed vehicles.

=== Advantages ===
Liquid nitrogen vehicles are comparable in many ways to electric vehicles, but use liquid nitrogen to store the energy instead of batteries. Their potential advantages over other vehicles include:

- Much like electrical vehicles, liquid nitrogen vehicles would ultimately be powered through the electrical grid, which makes it easier to focus on reducing pollution from one source, as opposed to the millions of vehicles on the road.
- Transportation of the fuel would not be required due to drawing power off the electrical grid. This presents significant cost benefits. Pollution created during fuel transportation would be eliminated.
- Lower maintenance costs
- Liquid nitrogen tanks can be disposed of or recycled with less pollution than batteries.
- Liquid nitrogen vehicles are unconstrained by the degradation problems associated with current battery systems.
- The tank may be able to be refilled more often and in less time than batteries can be recharged, with re-fueling rates comparable to liquid fuels.
- It can work as part of a combined cycle powertrain in conjunction with a petrol or diesel engine, using the waste heat from one to run the other in a turbocompound system. It can even run as a hybrid system.

=== Disadvantages ===
The principal disadvantage is the inefficient use of primary energy. Energy is used to liquefy nitrogen, which in turn provides the energy to run the motor. Any conversion of energy has losses. For liquid nitrogen cars, electrical energy is lost during the liquefaction process of nitrogen.

Liquid nitrogen is not available in public refueling stations; however, there are distribution systems in place at most welding gas suppliers and liquid nitrogen is an abundant by-product of liquid oxygen production.

== Criticisms ==
=== Cost of production ===
Liquid nitrogen production is an energy-intensive process. Currently practical refrigeration plants producing a few tons/day of liquid nitrogen operate at about 50% of Carnot efficiency. Currently surplus liquid nitrogen is produced as a byproduct in the production of liquid oxygen.

=== Energy density of liquid nitrogen ===
Any process that relies on a phase-change of a substance will have much lower energy densities than processes involving a chemical reaction in a substance, which in turn have lower energy densities than nuclear reactions. Liquid nitrogen as an energy store has a low energy density. Liquid hydrocarbon fuels, by comparison, have a high energy density. A high energy density makes the logistics of transport and storage more convenient. Convenience is an important factor in consumer acceptance. The convenient storage of petroleum fuels combined with its low cost has led to an unrivaled success. In addition, a petroleum fuel is a primary energy source, not just an energy storage and transport medium.

The energy density—derived from nitrogen's isobaric heat of vaporization and specific heat in gaseous state—that can theoretically be realised from liquid nitrogen at atmospheric pressure and 27 °C ambient temperature is about 213 watt-hours per kilogram (W·h/kg), while typically only 97 W·h/kg can be achieved under realistic circumstances. This compares with 100–250 W·h/kg for a lithium-ion battery and 3,000 W·h/kg for a gasoline combustion engine running at 28% thermal efficiency, 14 times the density of liquid nitrogen used at the Carnot efficiency.

For an isothermal expansion engine to have a range comparable to an internal combustion engine, a 350-litre (92 US gal) insulated onboard storage vessel is required. A practical volume, but a noticeable increase over the typical 50-litre (13 US gal) gasoline tank. The addition of more complex power cycles would reduce this requirement and help enable frost free operation. However, no commercially practical instances of liquid nitrogen use for vehicle propulsion exist.

=== Frost formation ===
Unlike internal combustion engines, using a cryogenic working fluid requires heat exchangers to warm and cool the working fluid. In a humid environment, frost formation will prevent heat flow and thus represents an engineering challenge. To prevent frost build up, multiple working fluids can be used. This adds topping cycles to ensure the heat exchanger does not fall below freezing. Additional heat exchangers, weight, complexity, efficiency loss, and expense, would be required to enable frost free operation.

=== Safety ===
However efficient the insulation on the nitrogen fuel tank, there will inevitably be losses by evaporation to the atmosphere. If a vehicle is stored in a poorly ventilated space, there is some risk that leaking nitrogen could reduce the oxygen concentration in the air and cause asphyxiation. Since nitrogen is a colorless and odourless gas that already makes up 78 per cent of air, such a change would be difficult to detect.

Cryogenic liquids are hazardous if spilled. Liquid nitrogen can cause frostbite and can make some materials extremely brittle.

As liquid nitrogen is colder than 90.2K, oxygen from the atmosphere can condense. Liquid oxygen can spontaneously and violently react with organic chemicals, including petroleum products like asphalt.

Since the liquid to gas expansion ratio of this substance is 1:694, a tremendous amount of force can be generated if liquid nitrogen is rapidly vaporized. In an incident in 2006 at Texas A&M University, the pressure-relief devices of a tank of liquid nitrogen were sealed with brass plugs. As a result, the tank failed catastrophically, and exploded.

== See also ==
- Energy storage
- Cryogenic energy storage
- Future energy development
- Ultra-low-emission vehicle
