= British Compressed Gases Association =

- Abbreviation: BCGA
- Formation: 1971
- Legal status: Non-profit company
- Purpose: Trade Association - Industrial, medical and food gases in the United Kingdom
- Location: 4a Mallard Way, Pride Park, Derby, DE24 8GX
- Region served: UK
- Members: 100 + companies
- Chief Executive: Ellen Daniels
- Main organ: BCGA Council
- Affiliations: European Industrial Gas Association (EIGA), Compressed Gas Association (CGA)
- Website: www.bcga.co.uk

The British Compressed Gases Association is the UK's trade association for companies in the industrial, medical and food gases industry. BCGA was established in August 1971, succeeding the British Acetylene Association, which was formed in 1901.

== Overview ==
The BCGA represents companies that manufacture, supply or distribute industrial, medical and food gases in the United Kingdom, including those providing related equipment, distribution systems, and health, safety, quality, inspection and training services. It represents over 100 member companies and functions as a safety and technical trade association, publishing best practice guidance documents for the industry.

== Standards ==
The gases industry uses many standards and its members are represented at safety standards organisations such as BSI, the European Committee for Standardization (CEN) and the International Organization for Standardization (ISO).

== Structure ==
The head Offices is based in Derby.

Its members include all the major gas suppliers in the UK and many SME's.

== See also ==
- British Compressed Air Society
