= Liquid Air =

Defunct American motor vehicle manufacturer

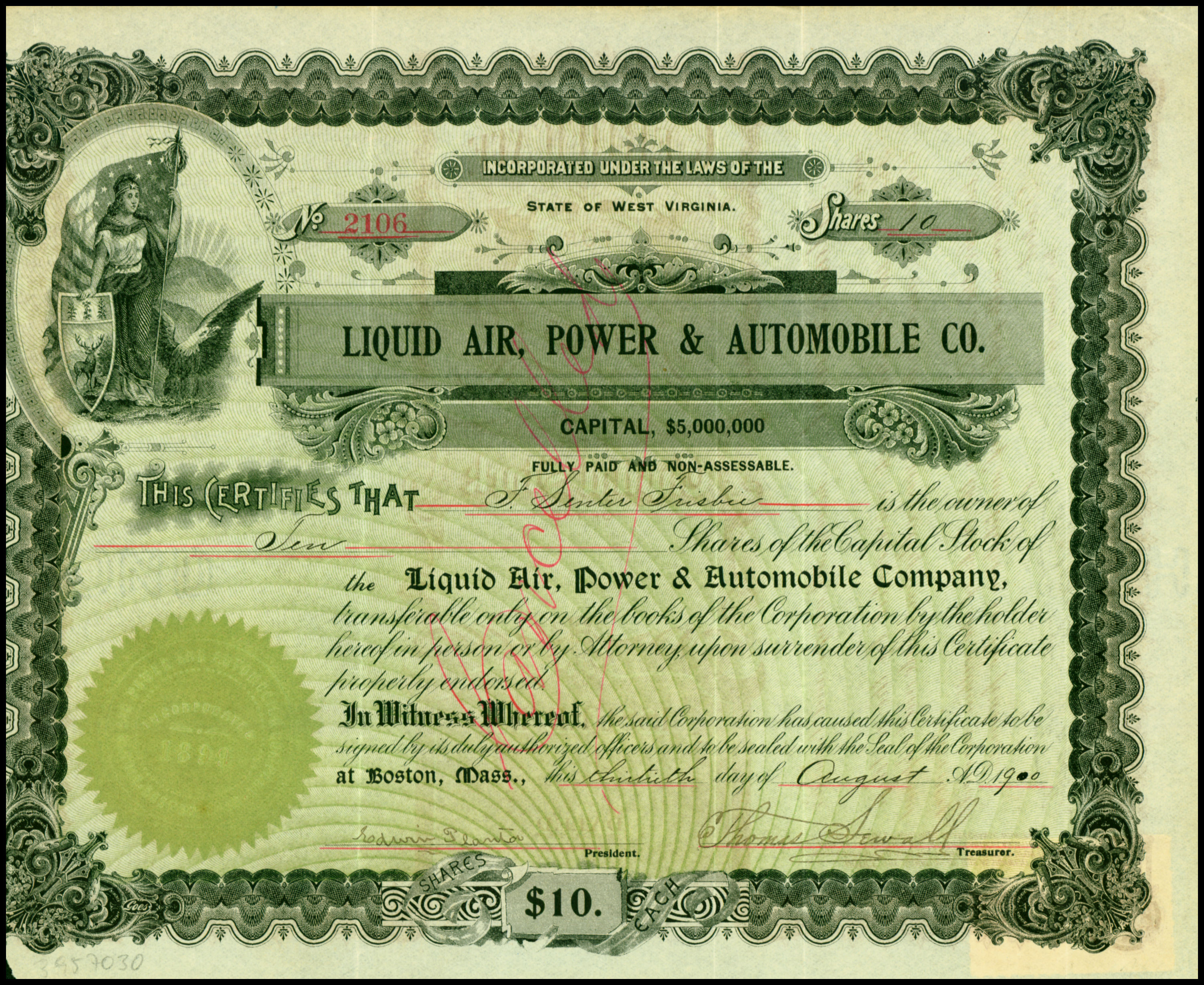
Share of the Liquid Air, Power & Automobile Co., issued 30. August 1900

Liquid Air was the marque of an automobile planned by Liquid Air Power and Automobile Co. of Boston and New York City in 1899.

A factory location was acquired in Boston, Massachusetts, in 1899, and Liquid Air claimed they would construct a car that would run a hundred miles on liquid air. In 1901, the company had gone into receivership with declared capital stock of $1,500,000 but assets of only $7,500.

== See also ==
- Alternative fuel vehicle
- Compressed-air vehicle
- Liquid nitrogen vehicle
