= Liquid nitrogen =

Liquid state of nitrogen

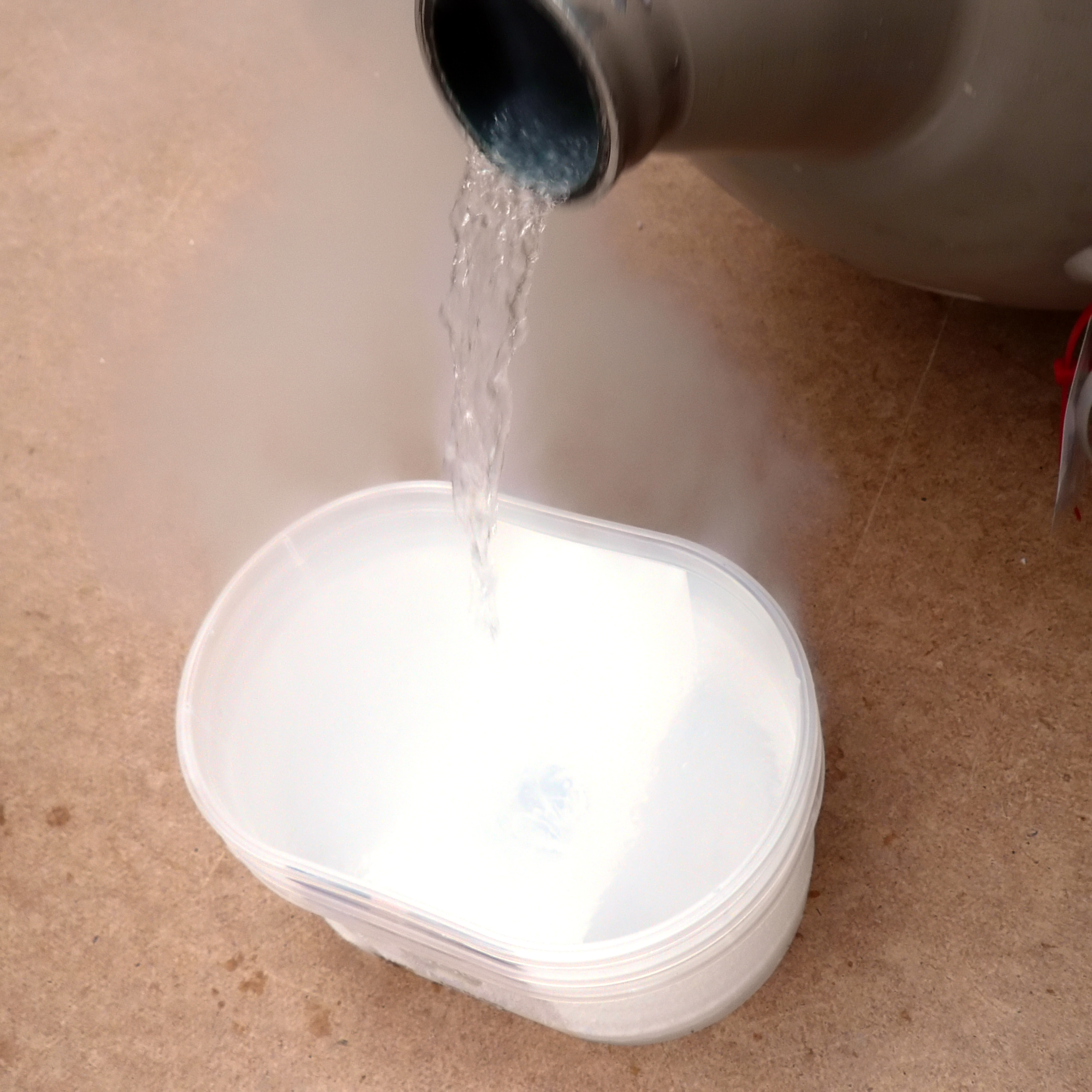
Liquid nitrogen

A demonstration of liquid nitrogen at the Freeside maker space in Atlanta, Georgia, during the Online News Association conference in 2013

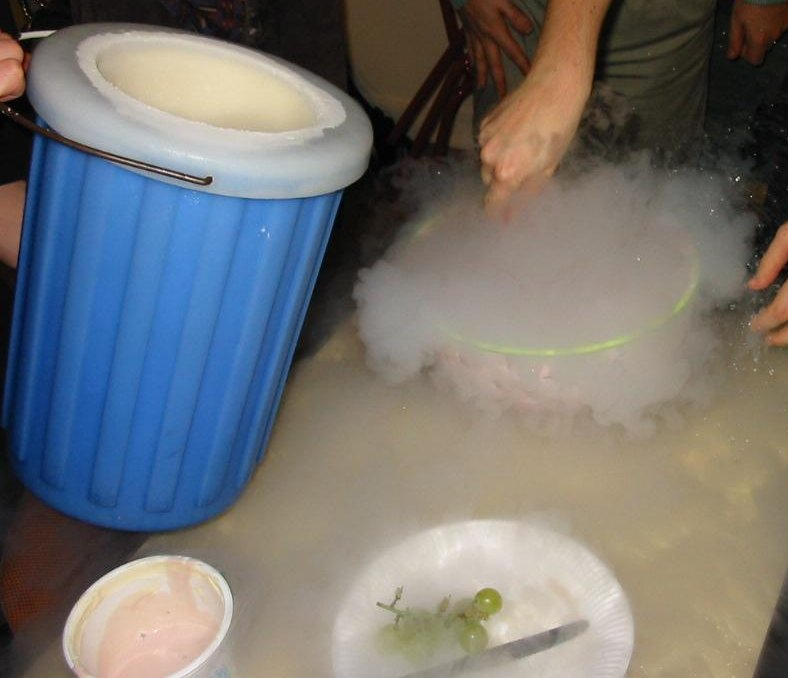
Students preparing homemade ice cream with a dewar of liquid nitrogen

Liquid nitrogen (LN_{2}) is nitrogen in a liquid state at low temperature. It has a boiling point of about −196 °C (−321 °F; 77 K). Liquid nitrogen is produced industrially by fractional distillation of liquid air. It is a colorless, mobile liquid whose viscosity is about half that of acetone (i.e. roughly one-sixth that of water at room temperature). Liquid nitrogen is widely used as a coolant.

== Physical properties ==
The diatomic character of the N_{2} molecule is retained after liquefaction. The weak van der Waals interaction between the N_{2} molecules results in little intermolecular attraction. This is the cause of nitrogen's unusually low boiling point.

The temperature of liquid nitrogen can readily be reduced to its freezing point −210 °C (−346 °F; 63 K) by placing it in a vacuum chamber pumped by a vacuum pump. Liquid nitrogen's efficiency as a coolant is limited by the fact that it boils immediately on contact with a warmer object, enveloping the object in an insulating layer of nitrogen gas bubbles. This effect, known as the Leidenfrost effect, occurs when any liquid comes in contact with a surface which is significantly hotter than its boiling point. Faster cooling may be obtained by plunging an object into a slush of liquid and solid nitrogen rather than liquid nitrogen alone.

== Handling ==
As a cryogenic fluid that rapidly freezes living tissue, its handling and storage require thermal insulation. It can be stored and transported in vacuum flasks, the temperature being held constant at 77 K by slow boiling of the liquid. Depending on the size and design, the holding time of vacuum flasks ranges from a few hours to a few weeks. The development of pressurised super-insulated vacuum vessels has enabled liquid nitrogen to be stored and transported over longer time periods with losses reduced to 2 percent per day or less.

== Uses ==
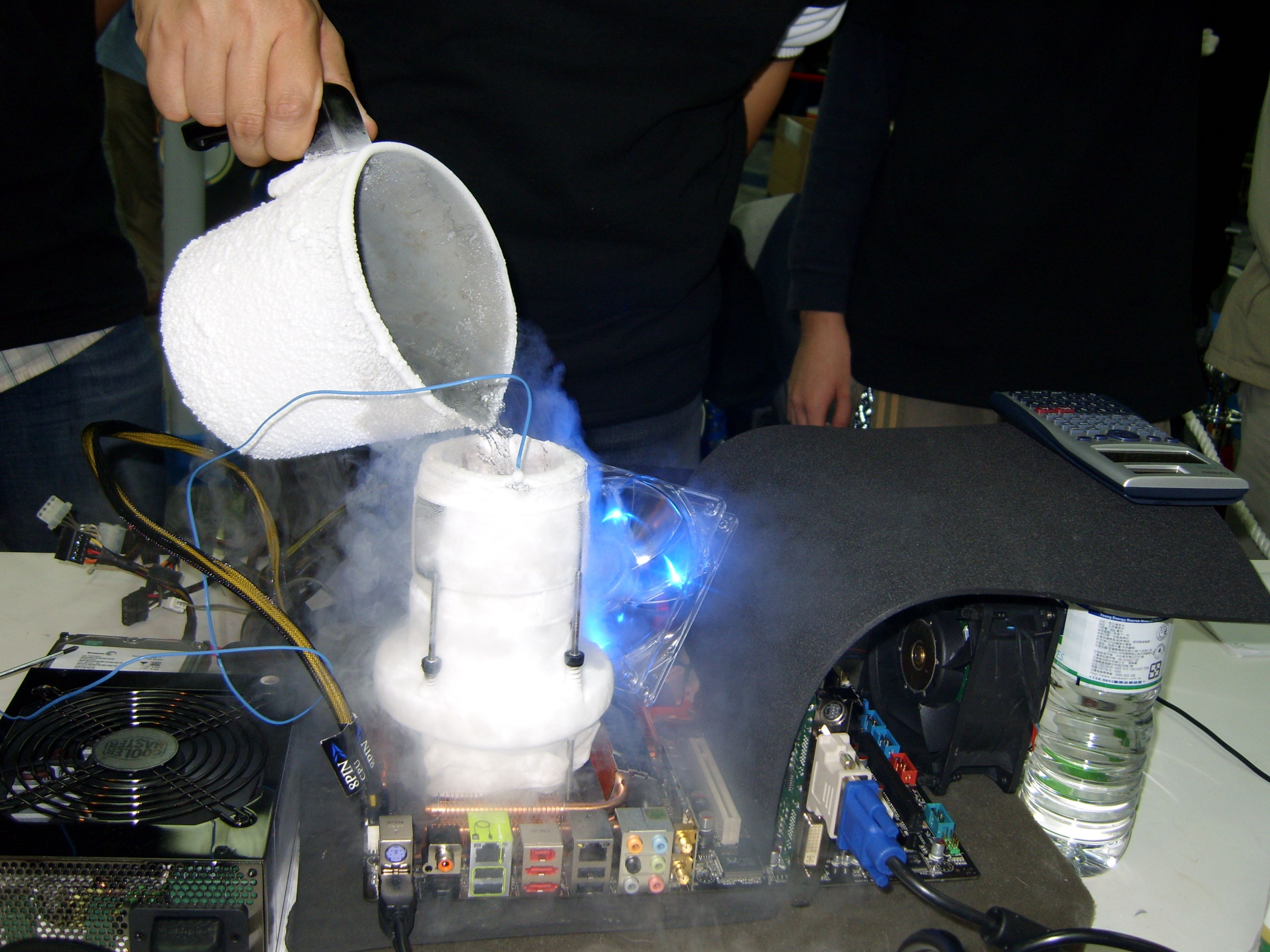
Liquid nitrogen may be used for cooling an overclocked computer, when an extreme measure of cooling is needed.

Liquid nitrogen is a compact and readily transported source of dry nitrogen gas, as it does not require pressurization. Further, its ability to maintain temperatures far below the freezing point of water, specific heat of 1040 J⋅kg^{−1}⋅K^{−1} and heat of vaporization of 200 kJ⋅kg^{−1} makes it extremely useful in a wide range of applications, primarily as an open-cycle refrigerant, including:

- in cryotherapy for removing unsightly or potentially malignant skin lesions such as warts and actinic keratosis
- to store cells at low temperature for laboratory work
- in cryogenics
- as a backup nitrogen source in hypoxic air fire prevention systems
- as a source of very dry nitrogen gas
- for the immersion, freezing, and transportation of food products
- for the cryopreservation of blood, reproductive cells (sperm and egg), and other biological samples and materials
  - to preserve tissue samples from surgical excisions for future studies
  - to facilitate cryoconservation of animal genetic resources
- to freeze water and oil pipes in order to work on them in situations where a valve is not available to block fluid flow to the work area; this method is known as a cryogenic isolation
- for cryonic preservation in hopes of future reanimation
- for shrink-fitting machinery parts together
- as a coolant
  - for charge-coupled cameras in astronomy
  - for a high-temperature superconductor to a temperature sufficient to achieve superconductivity
  - to maintain a low temperature around the primary liquid helium cooling system of high-field superconducting magnets used in e.g. nuclear magnetic resonance spectrometers and magnetic resonance imaging systems
  - for vacuum pump traps and in controlled-evaporation processes in chemistry
  - as a component of cooling baths used for very low temperature reactions in chemistry
  - to increase the sensitivity of infrared homing seeker heads of missiles such as the Strela 3
  - to temporarily shrink mechanical components during machine assembly and allow improved interference fits
  - for computers and extreme overclocking
  - for simulation of space background in vacuum chamber during spacecraft thermal testing
  - to control the temperature of mass concrete, injected to precool concrete mixes during delivery
- in container inerting and pressurisation by injecting a controlled amount of liquid nitrogen just prior to sealing or capping
- as an energy storage medium
- in freeze branding cattle
- In tunnel construction to stabilize unstable and loose terrains by injecting liquid nitrogen into soil to freeze the water present in the soil; with increased bearing capacity and impermeability, the improved ground will not collapse during excavation and subsequent works.

=== Culinary ===
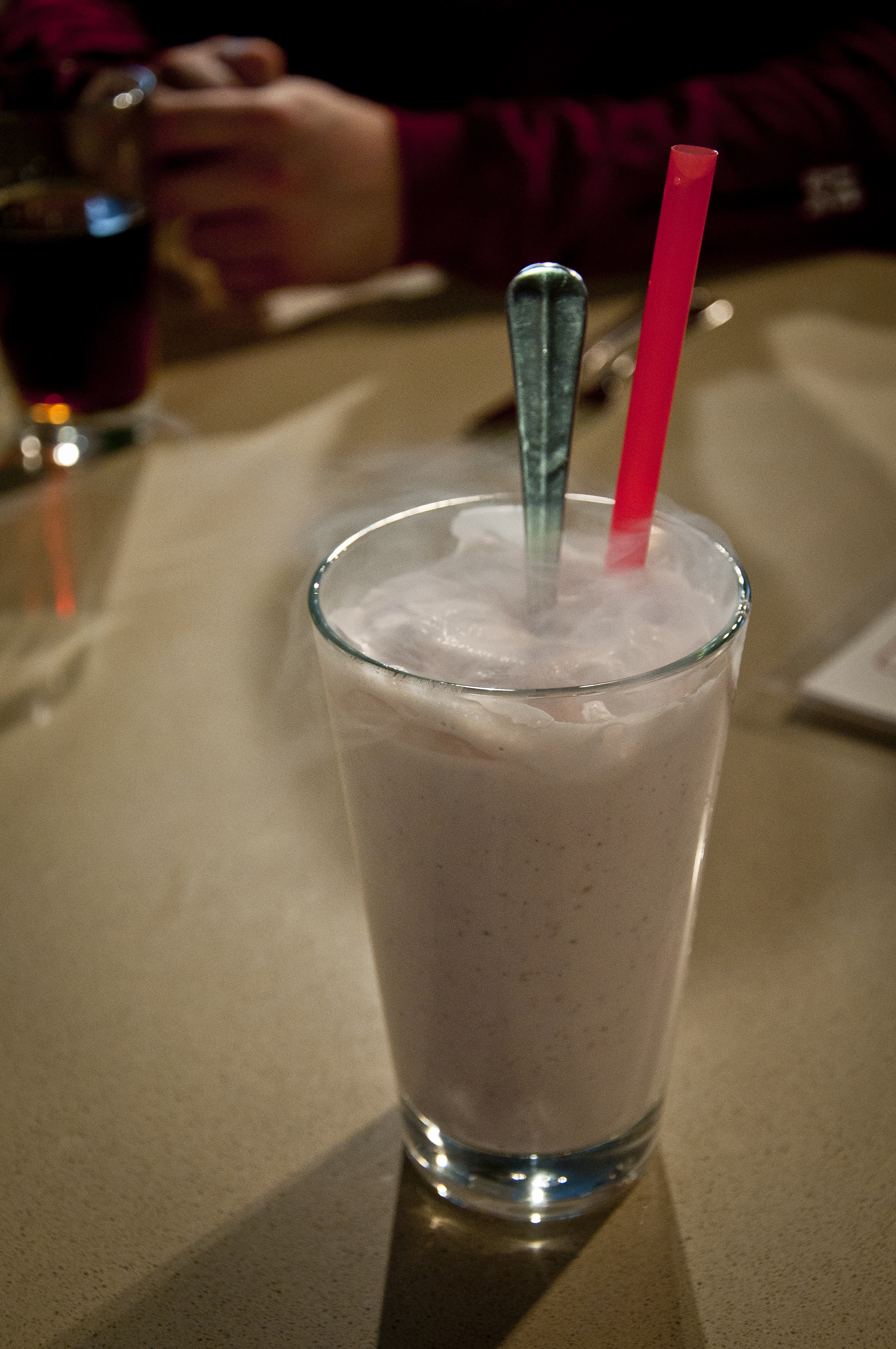
A milkshake prepared with liquid nitrogen. Nitrogen vapour can be seen emanating from the top of the glass.

The culinary use of liquid nitrogen is mentioned in an 1890 recipe book titled Fancy Ices authored by Agnes Marshall. It has been employed in more recent times by restaurants in the preparation of frozen desserts, such as ice cream, which can be created within moments at the table because of the speed at which it cools food. The rapidity of chilling also leads to the formation of smaller ice crystals than when chilled using traditional means, which provides the dessert with a smoother texture. The technique is employed by chef Heston Blumenthal who has used it at his restaurant, The Fat Duck, to create frozen dishes such as egg and bacon ice cream. Some bartenders use liquid nitrogen to quickly chill glasses, freeze ingredients, or add it as a featured ingredient in liquid nitrogen cocktails. It creates a smoky effect in a drink, which occurs as tiny droplets of the liquid nitrogen come into contact with the surrounding air, condensing the vapour that is naturally present. Much care should be taken into consideration when working with liquid nitrogen in dishes, as accidental swallowing of the liquid can result in severe and possibly fatal damage to the body.

== History ==
Nitrogen was first liquefied at the Jagiellonian University on 15 April 1883 by Polish physicists Zygmunt Wróblewski and Karol Olszewski.

== Safety ==
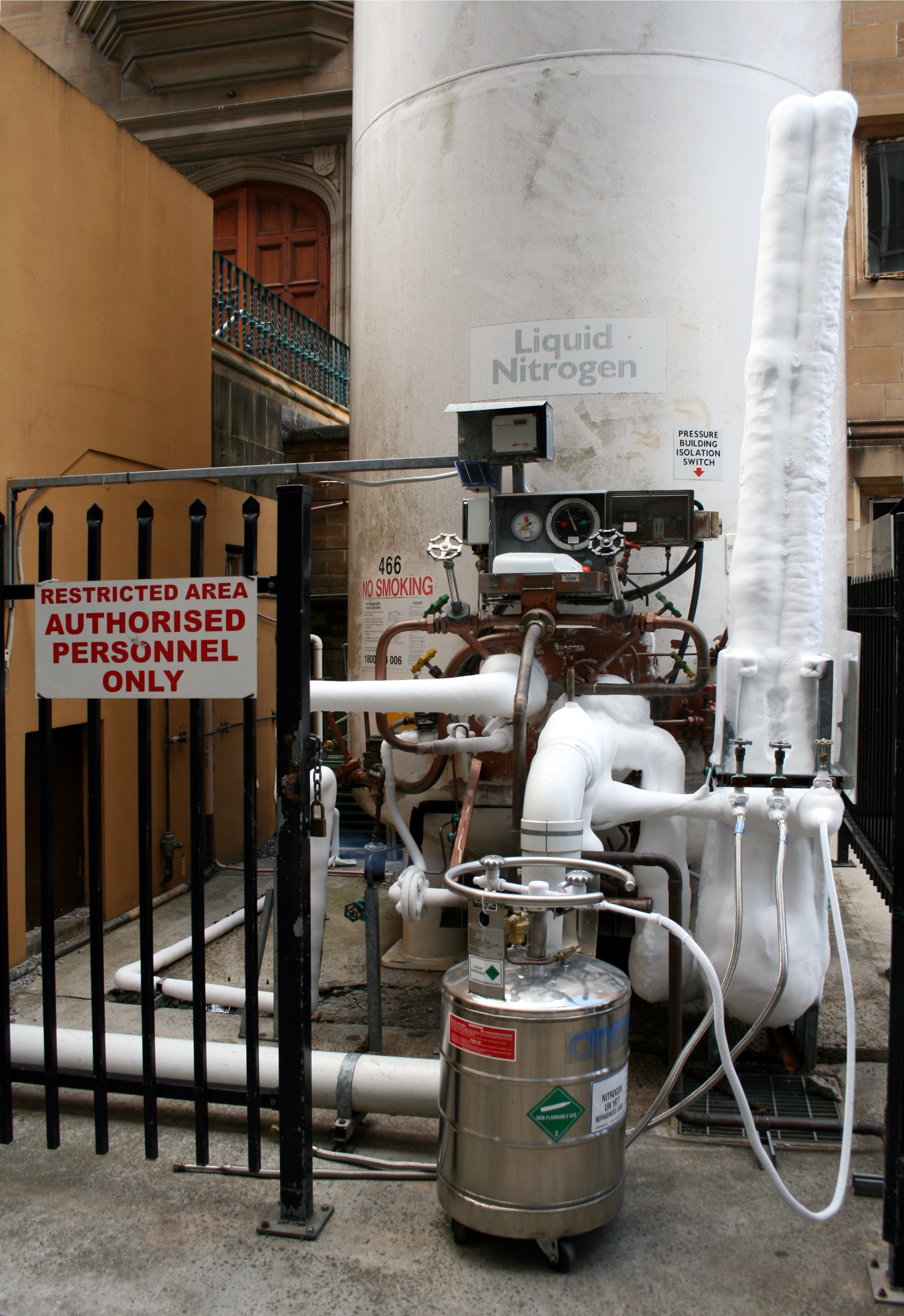
Filling a liquid nitrogen Dewar from a storage tank

Because the liquid-to-gas expansion ratio of nitrogen is 1:694 at 20 °C (68 °F), a tremendous amount of force can be generated if liquid nitrogen is vaporized in an enclosed space. In an incident on January 12, 2006 at Texas A&M University, the pressure-relief devices of a tank of liquid nitrogen were malfunctioning and later sealed. As a result of the subsequent pressure buildup, the tank failed catastrophically. The force of the explosion was sufficient to propel the tank through the ceiling immediately above it, shatter a reinforced concrete beam immediately below it, and blow the walls of the laboratory 10 to 20 cm (4 to 8 inches) off their foundations. In January 2021, a line carrying liquid nitrogen ruptured at a poultry processing plant in the U.S. state of Georgia, killing six people and injuring 11 others.

Because of its extremely low temperature, careless handling of liquid nitrogen and any objects cooled by it may result in cold burns. In that case, special gloves should be used while handling. However, a small splash or even pouring down skin will not burn immediately because of the Leidenfrost effect— the evaporating gas thermally insulates to some extent, like touching a hot element very briefly with a wet finger— but if the liquid nitrogen manages to pool anywhere, it will burn severely.

As liquid nitrogen evaporates it reduces the oxygen concentration in the air and can act as an asphyxiant, especially in confined spaces. Nitrogen is odorless, colorless, and tasteless and may produce asphyxia without any sensation or prior warning.

Oxygen sensors are sometimes used as a safety precaution when working with liquid nitrogen to alert workers of gas spills into a confined space.

Vessels containing liquid nitrogen can condense oxygen from air. The liquid in such a vessel becomes increasingly enriched in oxygen (boiling point 90 K; −183 °C; −298 °F) as the nitrogen evaporates, and can cause violent oxidation of organic material.

Ingestion of liquid nitrogen can cause severe internal damage, due to freezing of the tissues which come in contact with it and to the volume of gaseous nitrogen evolved as the liquid is warmed by body heat. In 1997, a physics student demonstrating the Leidenfrost effect by holding liquid nitrogen in his mouth accidentally swallowed the substance, resulting in near-fatal injuries. This was apparently the first case in medical literature of liquid nitrogen ingestion. In 2012, a young woman in England had her stomach removed after ingesting a cocktail made with liquid nitrogen.

== Production ==
Liquid nitrogen is produced commercially from the cryogenic distillation of liquified air or from the liquefaction of pure nitrogen derived from air using pressure swing adsorption. An air compressor is used to compress filtered air to high pressure; the high-pressure gas is cooled back to ambient temperature, and allowed to expand to a low pressure. The expanding air cools greatly (the Joule–Thomson effect), and oxygen, nitrogen, and argon are separated by further stages of expansion and distillation. Small-scale production of liquid nitrogen is easily achieved using this principle. Liquid nitrogen may be produced for direct sale, or as a byproduct of manufacture of liquid oxygen used for industrial processes such as steelmaking. Liquid-air plants producing on the order of tons per day of product started to be built in the 1930s but became very common after the Second World War; a large modern plant may produce 3000 tons/day of liquid air products.

== See also ==
- Liquefaction of gases
- Industrial gas
- Computer cooling
- Cryogenic gas plant
- Liquid nitrogen engine
