= Citec =

Finnish engineering company

- Founded: 1984
- Headquarters: Vaasa, Finland
- Number of locations: Finland, Sweden, India, France, Germany, Norway
- Key people: Johan Westermarck (CEO)
- Services: Engineering and Information management services
- Revenue: ▲€73 million (2020)
- Owner: Sentica Partners, Winwest Oy and senior management
- Number of employees: 1200 (2022)
- Parent: Cyient (2022–)

Citec is a company that provides plant and product engineering, engineering consultancy as well as in technical documentation. The company trades within energy, process, oil & gas and machinery & equipment sectors.

The total number of employees is 1,000 and the turnover for 2020 was 73 million euros.

Citec is headquartered in Vaasa, Finland, and has offices in Finland, Sweden, Norway, France, Germany, India and Saudi Arabia.

The company Tri-Tech was founded in 1984 by Rune Westergård and Rolf Berg within the field of mechanical engineering.

During the first few years the company was a small engineering firm. In the early 1990s, a more rapid expansion phase began. Simultaneously as new lines of business emerged: environmental consultancy and technical documentation. These lines of business became two separate corporations in 1993 (Citec Environmental) and 2001 (Citec Information). In 2008, Citec Environmental became part of Citec Engineering Oy Ab.

In 2011 both companies - Citec Engineering Oy Ab and Citec Information Oy Ab – were consolidated into one group; Citec Oy Ab. A fund managed by Sentica Partners entered as the new majority shareholder with a 67 percent share and Martin Strand was appointed CEO as of June 1, 2011.

In conjunction with Martin Strand's retirement, Johan Westermarck was appointed CEO of Citec Group as of December 4, 2017.

In 2022, the Indian company Cyient purchased all of the shares of Citec for €94 million (equivalent to €99 million or US$107 million in 2023).

== History ==
- 2022: Cyient, an company in India, acquires Citec
- 2019: Wärtsilä Gas Solutions outsources Technical Documentation and P&ID Processes
- 2018: Outotec outsources 59 experts in Germany
- 2014: Citec acquires Cargotec engineering India
- 2013: Citec acquires M7 Offshore
- 2013: Citec acquires Akilea Engineering
- 2012: Citec acquires S&V Analysis
- 2011: Citec acquires German system engineering business Imotion
- 2011: Sentica Partners acquires a majority stake in Citec (67%), merges Citec Engineering and Citec Information
- 2009: Citec Engineering acquires KPA engineering
- 2003: Citec India was founded
- 1984: Citec was founded
