= Liquefaction of gases =

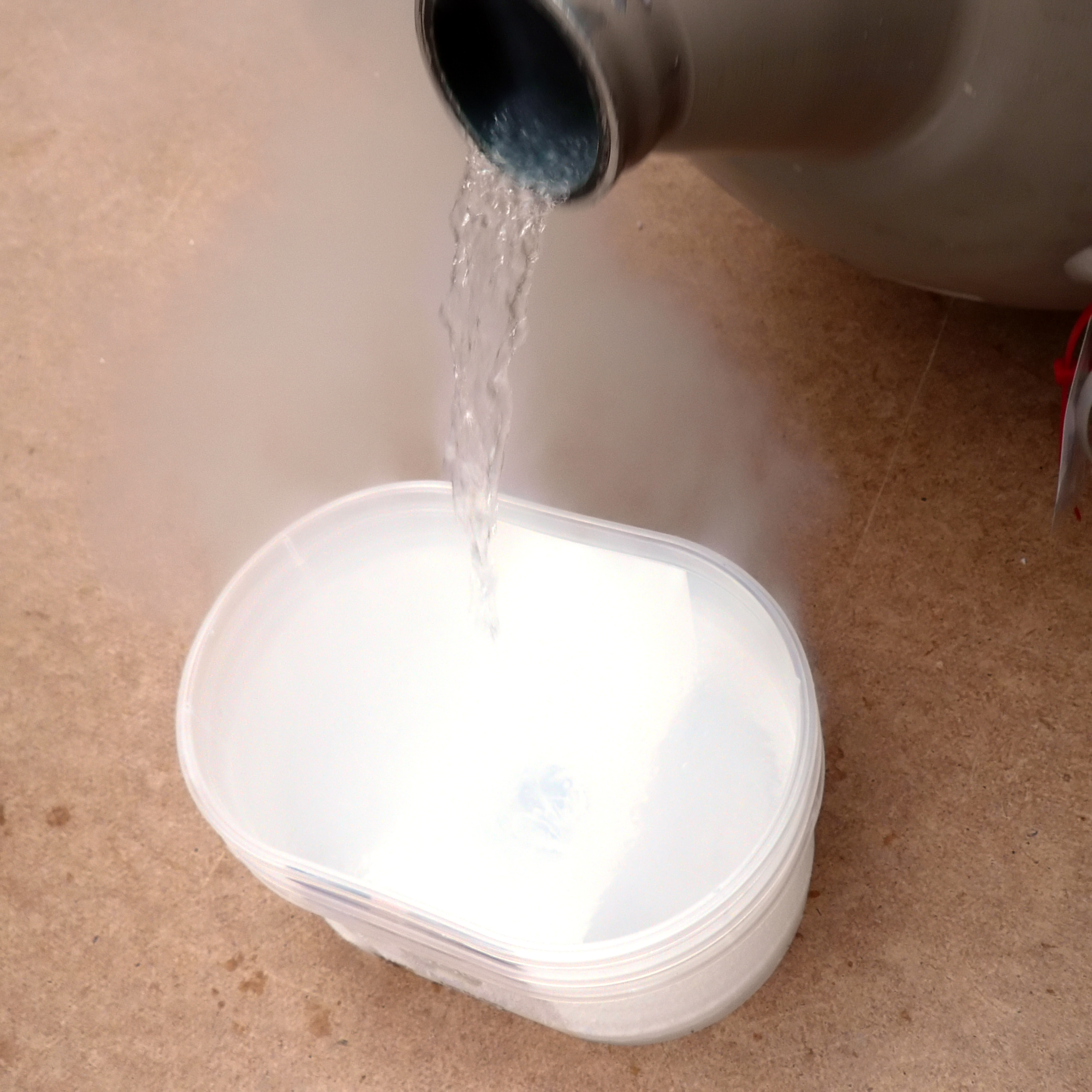
Liquid nitrogen

Liquefaction of gases is physical conversion of a gas into a liquid state (condensation). The liquefaction of gases is a complex process that employs various compression and expansion steps to achieve high pressures and very low temperatures, for example, using turboexpanders.

== Uses ==
Liquefaction processes are used for scientific, industrial, and commercial purposes. Many gases can be put into a liquid state at normal atmospheric pressure by simple cooling; a few, such as carbon dioxide, require pressurization as well. Liquefaction is used to analyze the fundamental properties of gas molecules (intermolecular forces), to store gases (e.g., LPG), and in refrigeration and air conditioning. There, the gas is liquefied in the condenser, where the heat of vaporization is released, and evaporated in the evaporator, where the heat of vaporization is absorbed. Ammonia was the first such refrigerant, and is still in widespread use in industrial refrigeration. In residential and commercial applications, it has largely been replaced by compounds derived from petroleum and halogens.

Liquid oxygen is provided to hospitals for conversion to gas for patients with breathing problems, and liquid nitrogen is used in the medical field for cryosurgery, by inseminators to freeze semen, and by field and lab scientists to preserve samples. Liquefied chlorine is transported for eventual solution in water, after which it is used for water purification, sanitation of industrial waste, sewage and swimming pools, bleaching of pulp and textiles and manufacture of carbon tetrachloride, glycol and numerous other organic compounds as well as phosgene gas.

Liquefaction of helium (^{4}He) with the precooled Hampson–Linde cycle led to a Nobel Prize for Heike Kamerlingh Onnes in 1913. At ambient pressure the boiling point of liquefied helium is 4.22 K (−268.93 °C). Below 2.17 K liquid ^{4}He becomes a superfluid (Nobel Prize 1978, Pyotr Kapitsa) and shows characteristic properties such as heat conduction through second sound, zero viscosity and the fountain effect among others.

The liquefaction of air is used to obtain nitrogen, oxygen, and argon and other atmospheric noble gases by separating the air components by fractional distillation in a cryogenic air separation unit.

== Liquid air ==
=== Linde's process ===
Air is liquefied by the Linde process, in which air is alternately compressed, cooled, and expanded; each expansion results in a considerable reduction in temperature. At lower temperatures, molecules move more slowly and occupy less space, so the air condenses into a liquid.

=== Claude's process ===
Air can also be liquefied by Claude's process, in which the gas is allowed to expand isentropically twice in two chambers. While expanding, the gas has to do work as it is led through an expansion turbine. The gas is not yet liquid, since that would destroy the turbine. Commercial air liquefication plants bypass this problem by expanding the air at supercritical pressures. Final liquefaction takes place by isenthalpic expansion in a thermal expansion valve.

== See also ==
- Air Liquide
- Air Products & Chemicals
- Air separation
- The BOC Group
- Chemical engineer
- Compressibility factor
- Fischer–Tropsch process
- Gas separation
- Gas to liquids
- Hampson–Linde cycle
- Industrial gases
- The Linde Group
- Liquefaction point
- Louis Paul Cailletet
- Messer Group
- Praxair
- Siemens cycle
