= Alternative =

Alternative or alternate may refer to:

== Arts, entertainment and media ==
- Alternative (Kamen Rider), a character in the Japanese TV series Kamen Rider Ryuki
- Alternative comics, or independent comics are an alternative to mainstream superhero comics
- Alternative fashion, fashion that stands apart from mainstream, commercial fashion
- Alternative manga, manga published outside the more commercial market, or which have different art styles, themes, and narratives to those found in the more popular manga magazines
- AlterNative, academic journal
- The Alternative (film), a 1978 Australian television film
- The Alternative, a radio show hosted by Tony Evans
- 120 Minutes (2004 TV program), an alternative rock music video program formerly known as The Alternative
- The American Spectator, an American magazine formerly known as The Alternative: An American Spectator

=== Music ===
- Alternative dance, a musical genre that mixes alternative rock with electronic dance music
- Alternative hip-hop, subgenre of hip-hop music that encompasses a wide range of styles that are not typically identified as mainstream
- Alternative pop, pop music with broad commercial appeal that is made by figures outside the mainstream, or which is considered more original, challenging, or eclectic than traditional pop music
- Alternative rock, also known as "alternative music" or simply "alternative"
- Alternative metal, genre of heavy metal music that combines heavy metal with influences from alternative rock and other genres not normally associated with metal
- Alternative (album), a B-sides album by Pet Shop Boys
- The Alternative (album), an album by IAMX
- The Alternative (online magazine), a music and culture site founded in 2014
- "Altern-ate", a song by H-el-ical//, 2020

== Sports ==
- Alternate (sports), a replacement or backup for a regular or starting team player

== Mathematics and science ==
- Alternativity, a weaker property than associativity
- Alternate leaves, a classification in botanical phyllotaxis

== Politics ==
- The Alternative (Denmark), a green political party in Denmark
- The Alternative (France), electoral coalition
- The Alternative (Palestine), a former electoral alliance of several socialist Palestinian groups
- Alternativa (Kosovo), a liberal political party in Kosovo
- Alternativa (Italian political party), a populist political party in Italy
- Alternativa (North Macedonia), a political party in North Macedonia
- Alternative (political bloc), in the Republic of Moldova
- Alternative – die Grünen Zug, a green political party in Switzerland

== See also ==
- Alt-right (abbreviated from alternative right) is a far-right, white nationalist movement
- Alt porn, a shortening of "alternative pornography," is a subgenre of pornography that is centered around alternative subcultures, such as goths, hipsters, emos, scenes, skaters or ravers, and is often produced by small and independent websites or filmmakers
- Alternate (theatre)
- Alternative fuel
- Alternative fuel locomotive
- Alternative fuel vehicle
- Alternative housing
- Alternative lifestyle
- Alternative natural materials
- Alternate reality (disambiguation)
- Alternatives, a Canadian non-governmental organization
- Alternating (disambiguation)
- Alternative culture, a variety of subcultures existing along the fringes of mainstream culture
- Alternative education, non-traditional education
- Alternative facts, expression associated with political misinformation coined in 2017
- Alternative media, media practices falling outside the mainstreams of corporate communication
- Alternative music (disambiguation)
- Alternative press (disambiguation)
- The Alternate (disambiguation)
- Alternative science (disambiguation)
