= Manuela Weichelt-Picard =

Swiss politician

- Manuela Weichelt-Picard in 2023

Member of the National Council of Switzerland
- Incumbent
- Assumed office 2019

Personal details
- Born: 21 July 1967 (age 59) Romanshorn
- Party: Green

Manuela Weichelt-Picard (born 21 July 1967 in Romanshorn; citizen of Zillis-Reischen) is a Swiss politician (Alternative – die Grünen Zug). She has been a member of the National Council since 2019.

== Biography ==
Weichelt-Picard grew up in the canton of Thurgau and in Neunkirch in the canton of Schaffhausen. She is a registered nurse and a certified social worker. Between 1995 and 1998, she headed the controlled heroin prescription program in the canton of Zug. From 1997 to 2002, she completed postgraduate studies for a Master of Public Health (MPH). Concurrently, from 2000 to 2005, she worked as a project manager at the health department of the canton of Graubünden, and from 2005 onward, she was a member of the management team at the Swiss Red Cross. She is the mother of two daughters and lives in Zug.

== Political career ==
From 1994 to 2002, she was a member of the Zug Cantonal Council as a representative of the Steinhausen-based party "Frische Brise" (Fresh Breeze) , and in this capacity, she was also a member of the hospital commission. In 2001, she survived the Zug massacre, when an assailant shot and killed 14 politicians during a session of the Cantonal Council in the Zug cantonal parliament building. She was parliamentary group leader from 1996 to 2002 and president of the Alternative Canton Zug from 2005 to 2007.

In January 2007, Weichelt-Picard, as a newly elected member of the Zug cantonal government, took over the Department of the Interior. She was re-elected in 2010 and 2014. At the end of 2016, she was elected by the cantonal parliament to a two-year term as Landammann (President of the Government). She did not run for re-election to the cantonal government in 2018. As neither the Alternative parties were able to retain their seats nor was the Social Democratic Party (SP) able to gain one, the left was consequently no longer represented in the Zug government for the first time since 1923. From 2010 to 2018, Weichelt-Picard was President of the Conference of Central Swiss Social Welfare Directors (ZGSDK).

She was elected to the National Council in the 2019 Swiss federal election and re-elected in the 2023 Swiss federal election. The Alternative Party thus regained the seat lost by Jo Lang in 2011. Weichelt-Picard is the first woman to be elected to the Federal Assembly from the canton of Zug. She is a member of the business audit committee and the Committee for Social Security and Health.

== See also ==
- List of members of the National Council of Switzerland, 2019–2023
- List of members of the National Council of Switzerland (2023–2027)
