= Alternating =

Alternating may refer to:

== Mathematics ==
- Alternating algebra, an algebra in which odd-grade elements square to zero
- Alternating form, a function formula in algebra
- Alternating group, the group of even permutations of a finite set
- Alternating knot, a knot or link diagram for which the crossings alternate under, over, under, over, as one travels along each component of the link
- Alternating map, a multilinear map that is zero whenever any two of its arguments are equal
- Alternating operator, a multilinear map in algebra
- Alternating permutation, a type of permutation studied in combinatorics
- Alternating series, an infinite series in which the signs of the general terms alternate between positive and negative

== Electronics ==
- Alternating current, a flow of electric charge that periodically reverses direction

== Other ==
- Alternating turns, the process by which people in a conversation decide who is to speak next

== See also ==
- Alternate bass
- Alternative (disambiguation)
