= Alternative science =

Alternative science may refer to:

- Fringe science, ideas whose attributes include being highly speculative or relying on premises already refuted
- Protoscience, a research field that has the characteristics of an undeveloped science that may ultimately develop into an established science
- Pseudoscience, statements, beliefs, or practices that claim to be scientific but are inherently incompatible with the scientific method

== See also ==
- Alternative (disambiguation)
- Science (disambiguation)
