= Alternative fuel vehicle =

Vehicle not powered by petrol or diesel

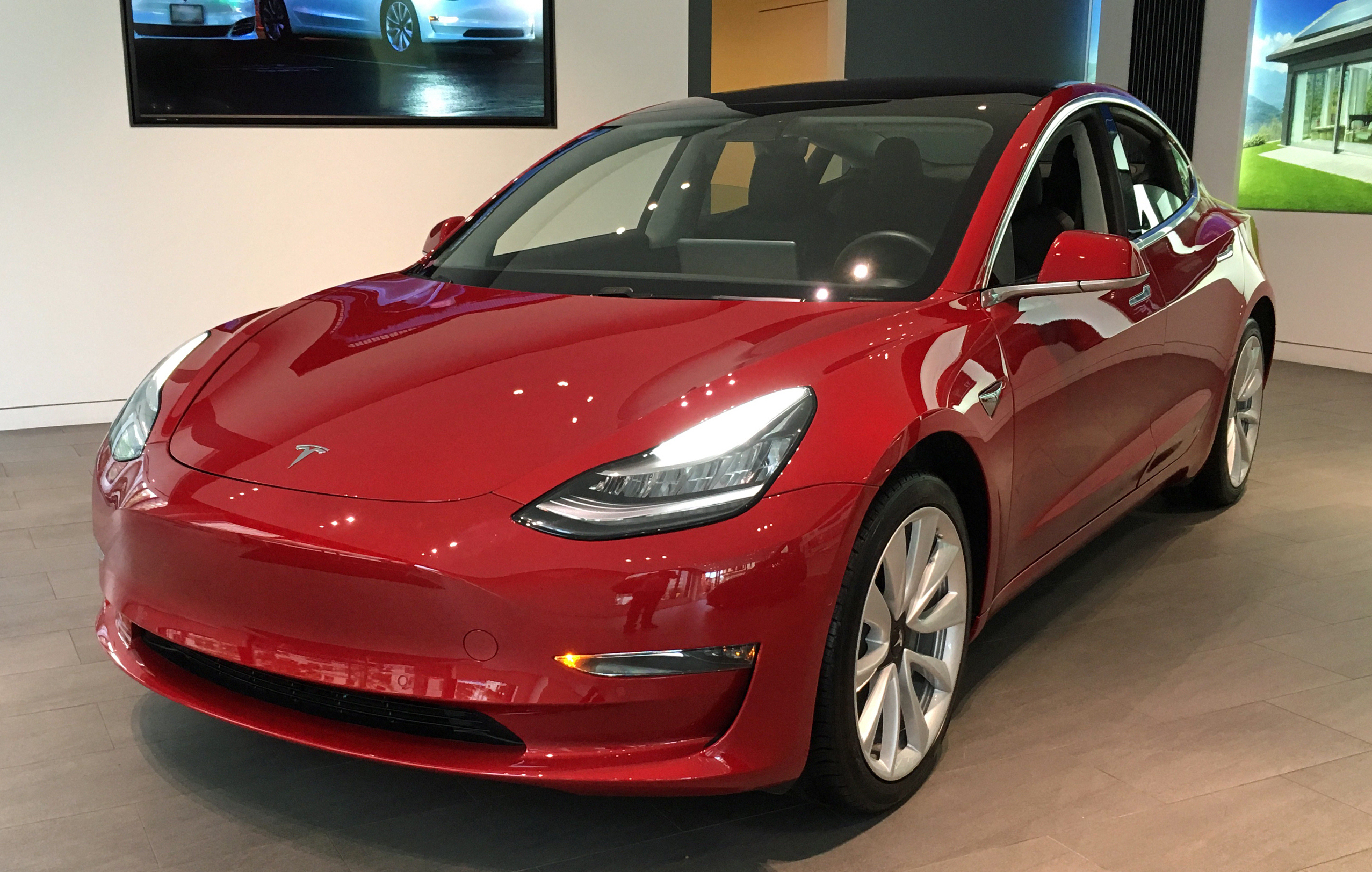
The Tesla Model 3 all-electric car is the world's all-time best-selling plug-in electric car with about 950,000 units sold as of March 2021.

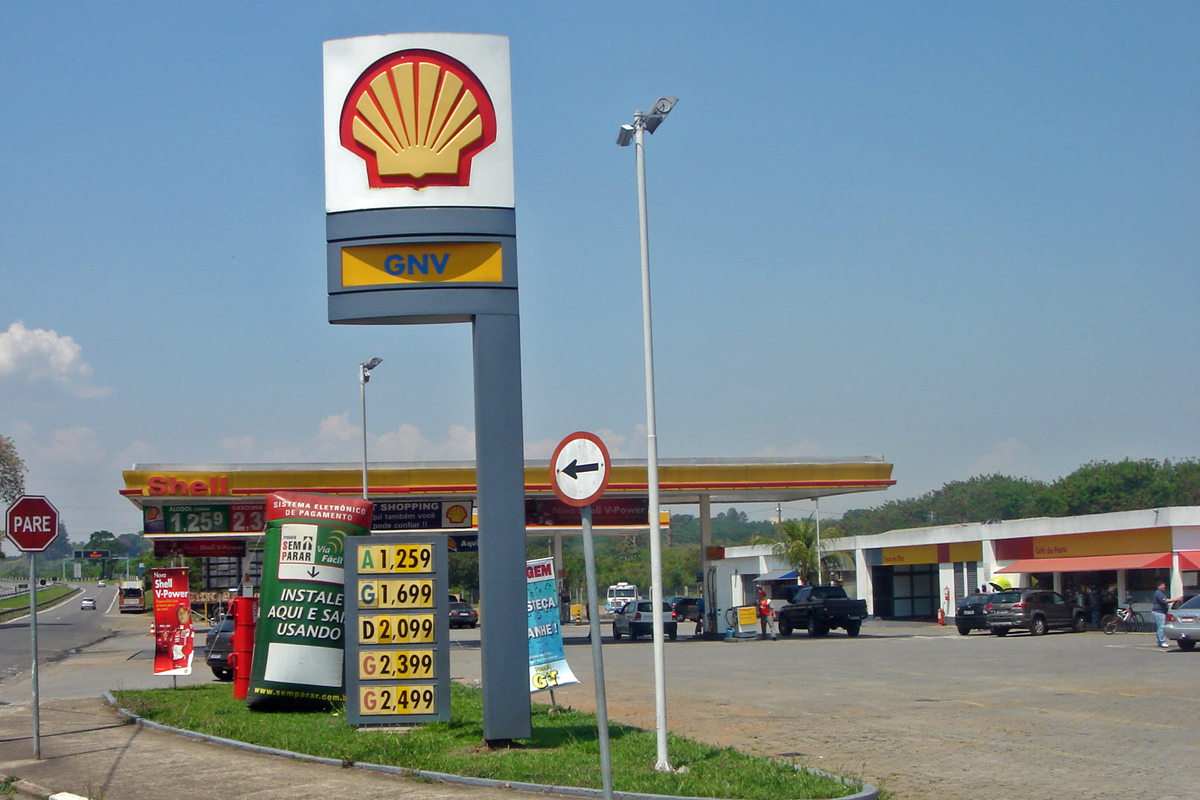
A Brazilian filling station with four alternative fuels for sale: biodiesel (B3), gasohol (E25), neat ethanol (E100), and compressed natural gas (CNG)

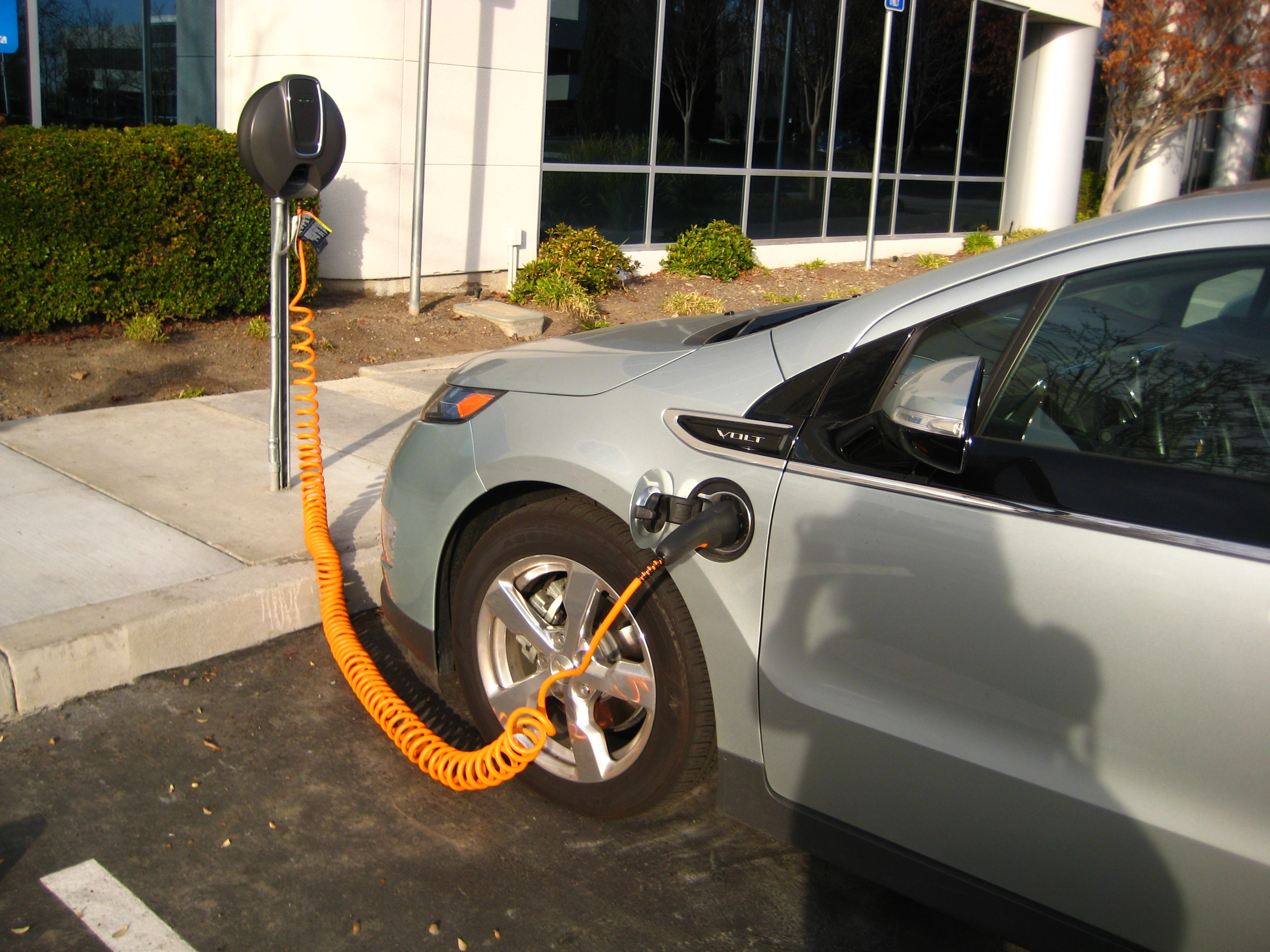
As of December 2016, the Chevrolet Volt family is the world's top selling plug-in hybrid, with global sales of about 134,500 units.

An alternative fuel vehicle is a motor vehicle that runs on alternative fuel rather than traditional petroleum-based fossil fuels such as gasoline, petrodiesel or liquefied petroleum gas (autogas). The term typically refers to internal combustion engine vehicles or fuel cell vehicles that utilize synthetic renewable fuels such as biofuels (ethanol fuel, biodiesel and biogasoline), hydrogen fuel or so-called "Electrofuel". The term can also be used to describe an electric vehicle (particularly a battery electric vehicle or a solar vehicle), which should be more appropriately called an "alternative energy vehicle" or "new energy vehicle" as its propulsion actually relies on electricity rather than motor fuel.

Vehicle engines powered by gasoline/petrol first emerged in the 1860s and 1870s; they took until the 1930s to completely dominate the original "alternative" engines driven by steam (18th century), by gases (early 19th century), or by electricity (c. 1830s). Because of a combination of factors, such as environmental and health concerns including climate change and air pollution, high oil-prices and the potential for peak oil, development of cleaner alternative fuels and advanced power systems for vehicles has become a high priority for many governments and vehicle manufacturers around the world in recent years.

Hybrid electric vehicles such as the Toyota Prius are not actually alternative fuel vehicles, as they still use traditional fuels such as gasoline, but through advancement in electric battery/supercapacitor and motor–generator technologies, they have an overall better fuel efficiency than conventional combustion vehicles. Other research and development efforts in alternative forms of power focus on developing plug-in electric, range extender and fuel cell vehicles, and even compressed-air vehicles.

An environmental analysis of the impacts of various vehicle-fuels extends beyond just operating efficiency and emissions, especially if a technology comes into wide use. A life-cycle assessment of a vehicle involves production and post-use considerations. In general, the lifecycle greenhouse gas emissions of battery-electric vehicles are lower than emissions from hydrogen, PHEV, hybrid, compressed natural gas, gasoline, and diesel vehicles.

== Current deployments ==
As of 2019, there were more than 1.49 billion motor vehicles on the world's roads, compared with approximately 159 million alternative fuel and advanced technology vehicles that had been sold or converted worldwide at the end of 2022 and consisting of:

- Over 65 million flex fuel automobiles, motorcycles and light duty trucks by the end of 2021, led by Brazil with 38.3 million and the United States with 27 million.
- Over 26 million plug-in electric vehicles, 70% of which were battery electric vehicles (BEVs) and 30% of which were plug-in hybrids (PHEVs). China had 13.8 million units, Europe 7.8 million, and the United States 3 million. In 2022, annual sales exceeded 10 million vehicles, up 55% relative to 2021.
- 24.9 million LPG powered vehicles by December 2013, led by Turkey with 3.93 million, South Korea (2.4 million), and Poland (2.75 million).
- 24.5 million natural gas vehicles by the end of 2017, led by China (5.35 million) followed by Iran (4.0 million), India (3.05 million), Pakistan (3 million), Argentina (2.3 million), and Brazil (1.78 million). In 2015, 2.4 million units were sold.
- Over 13 million hybrid electric vehicles as of 2019.
- 5.7 million neat-ethanol only light-vehicles built in Brazil since 1979, with 2.4 to 3.0 million vehicles still in use by 2003. and 1.22 million units as of December 2011.
- 70,200 fuel cell electric vehicles (FCEVs) powered with hydrogen by the end of 2022. South Korea had 29,500 units, the United States 15,000, China 11,200, and Japan 7,700. In 2022, annual sales amounted to 15,391 vehicles. Hydrogen FCEV sales as a percentage of market share among electric vehicles (BEVs, PHEVs and FCEVs) declined for the 6th consecutive year.

== Mainstream commercial technologies ==
=== Flexible fuel ===
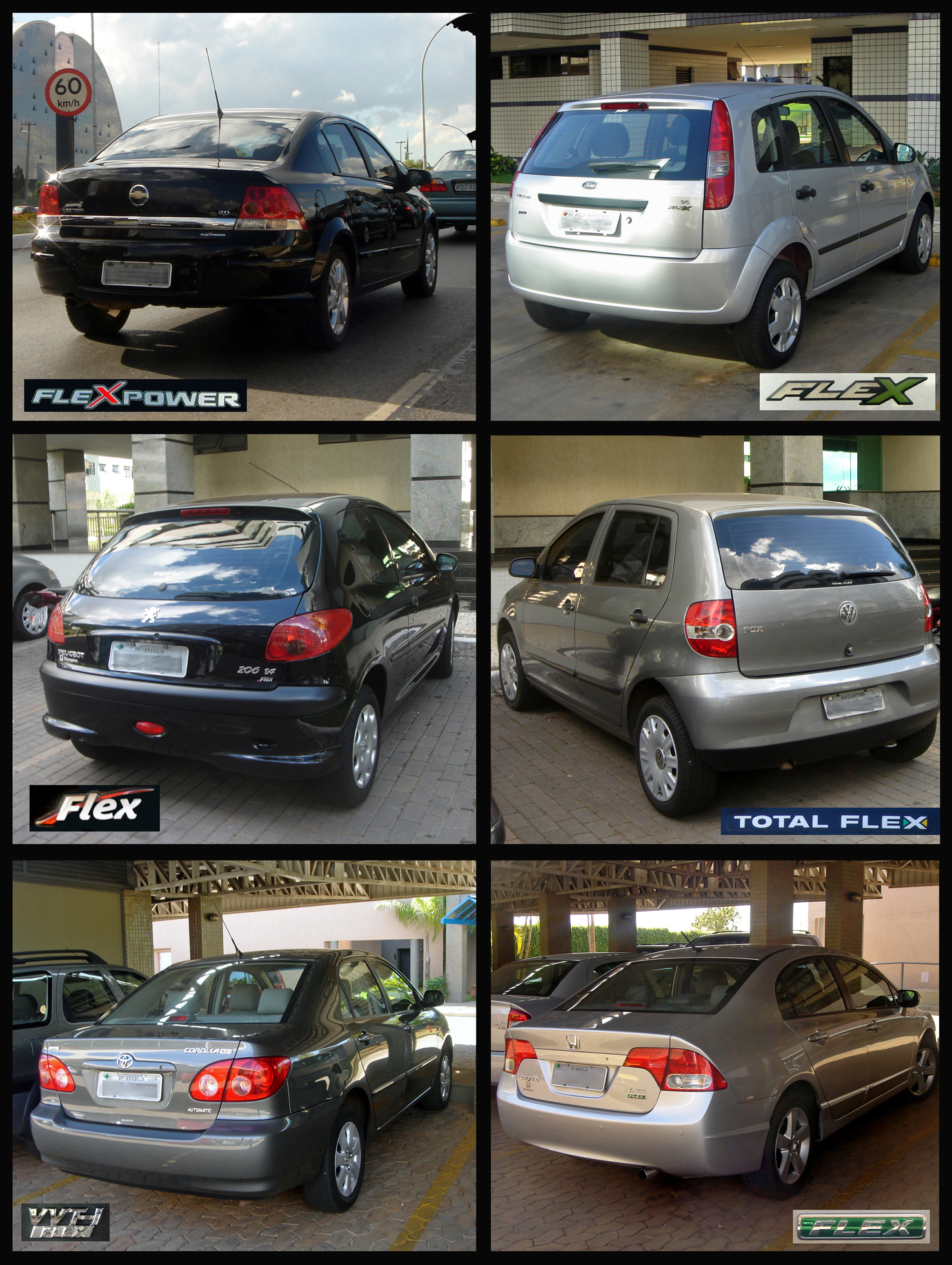
Six typical Brazilian full flex-fuel models from several carmakers, popularly known as "flex" cars, that run on any blend of ethanol and gasoline(actually between E20-E25 to E100).

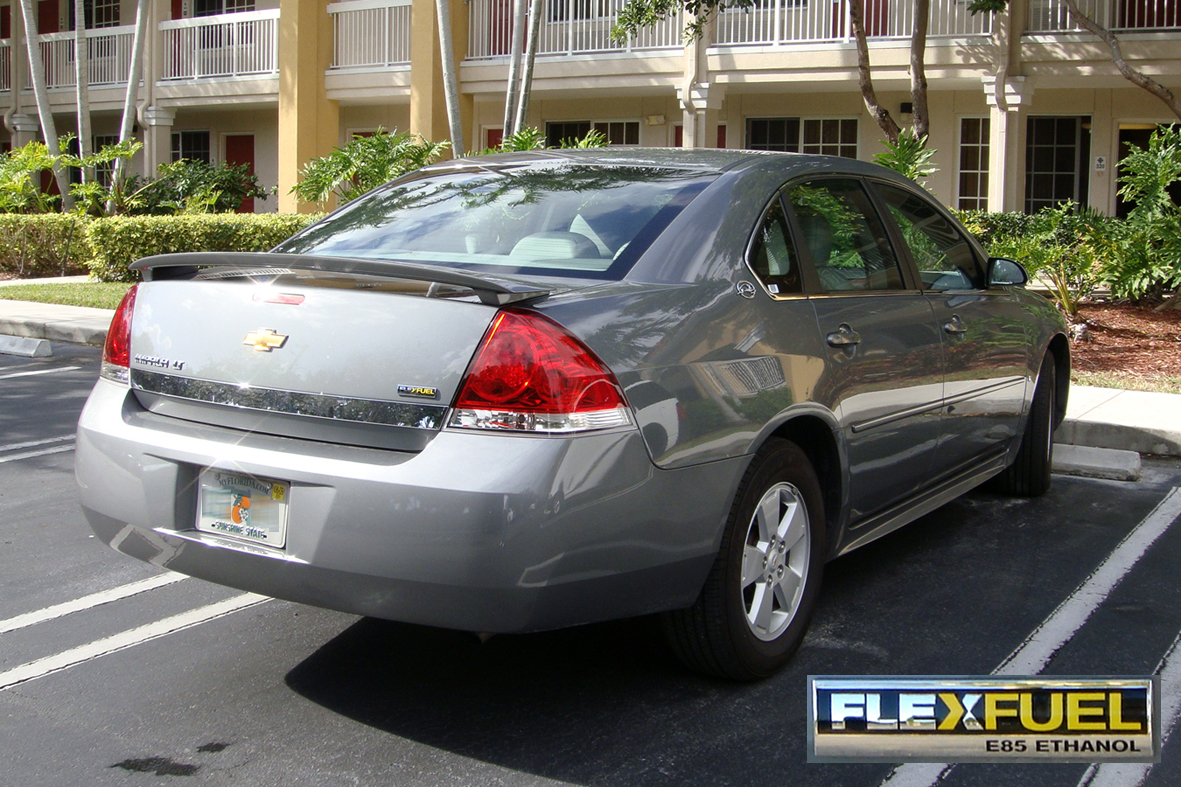
US E85FlexFuel Chevrolet Impala LT 2009.

A flexible-fuel vehicle (FFV) or dual-fuel vehicle (DFF) is an alternative fuel automobile or light duty truck with a multifuel engine that can use more than one fuel, usually mixed in the same tank, and the blend is burned in the combustion chamber together. These vehicles are colloquially called flex-fuel, or flexifuel in Europe, or just flex in Brazil. FFVs are distinguished from bi-fuel vehicles, where two fuels are stored in separate tanks. The most common commercially available FFV in the world market is the ethanol flexible-fuel vehicle, with the major markets concentrated in the United States, Brazil, Sweden, and some other European countries.

Ethanol flexible-fuel vehicles have standard gasoline engines that are capable of running with ethanol and gasoline mixed in the same tank. These mixtures have "E" numbers which describe the percentage of ethanol in the mixture, for example, E85 is 85% ethanol and 15% gasoline. (See common ethanol fuel mixtures for more information.) Though technology exists to allow ethanol FFVs to run on any mixture up to E100, in the U.S. and Europe, flex-fuel vehicles are optimized to run on E85. This limit is set to avoid cold starting problems during very cold weather.

Over 65 million flex fuel automobiles, motorcycles and light duty trucks by the end of 2021, led by Brazil with 38.3 million and the United States with 27 million. Other markets were Canada (1.6 million by 2014), and Sweden (243,100 through December 2014). The Brazilian flex fuel fleet includes over 4 million flexible-fuel motorcycles produced since 2009 through March 2015. In Brazil, 65% of flex-fuel car owners were using ethanol fuel regularly in 2009, while, the actual number of American FFVs being run on E85 is much lower; surveys conducted in the U.S. have found that 68% of American flex-fuel car owners were not aware they owned an E85 flex.

There have been claims that American automakers are motivated to produce flex-fuel vehicles due to a loophole in the Corporate Average Fuel Economy (CAFE) requirements, which gives the automaker a "fuel economy credit" for every flex-fuel vehicle sold, whether or not the vehicle is actually fueled with E85 in regular use. This loophole allegedly allows the U.S. auto industry to meet CAFE fuel economy targets not by developing more fuel-efficient models, but by spending between US$100 and US$200 extra per vehicle to produce a certain number of flex-fuel models, enabling them to continue selling less fuel-efficient vehicles such as SUVs, which netted higher profit margins than smaller, more fuel-efficient cars.

=== Plug-in electric ===
==== Battery-electric ====
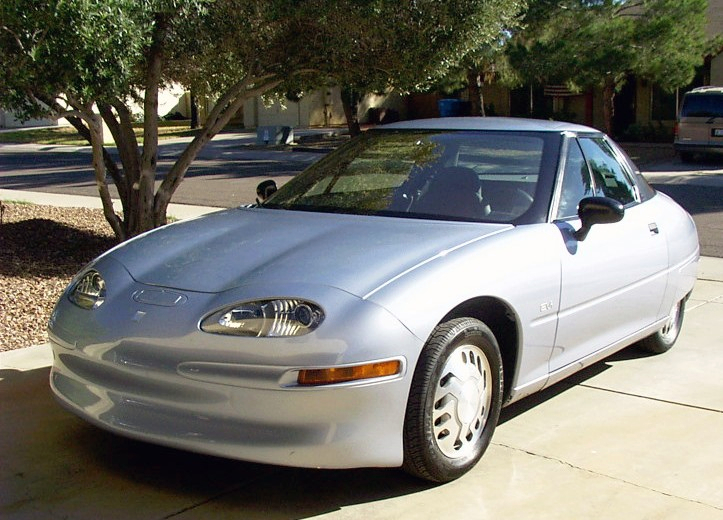
General Motors EV1 electric car

Battery electric vehicles (BEVs), also known as all-electric vehicles (AEVs), are electric vehicles whose main energy storage is in the chemical energy of batteries. BEVs are the most common form of what is defined by the California Air Resources Board (CARB) as zero emission vehicle (ZEV) because they produce no tailpipe emissions at the point of operation. The electrical energy carried on board a BEV to power the motors is obtained from a variety of battery chemistries arranged into battery packs. For additional range genset trailers or pusher trailers are sometimes used, forming a type of hybrid vehicle. Batteries used in electric vehicles include "flooded" lead-acid, absorbed glass mat, NiCd, nickel metal hydride, Li-ion, Li-poly and zinc-air batteries.

Attempts at building viable, modern battery-powered electric vehicles began in the 1950s with the introduction of the first modern (transistor controlled) electric car – the Henney Kilowatt, even though the concept was out in the market since 1890. Despite the poor sales of the early battery-powered vehicles, development of various battery-powered vehicles continued through the mid-1990s, with such models as the General Motors EV1 and the Toyota RAV4 EV.

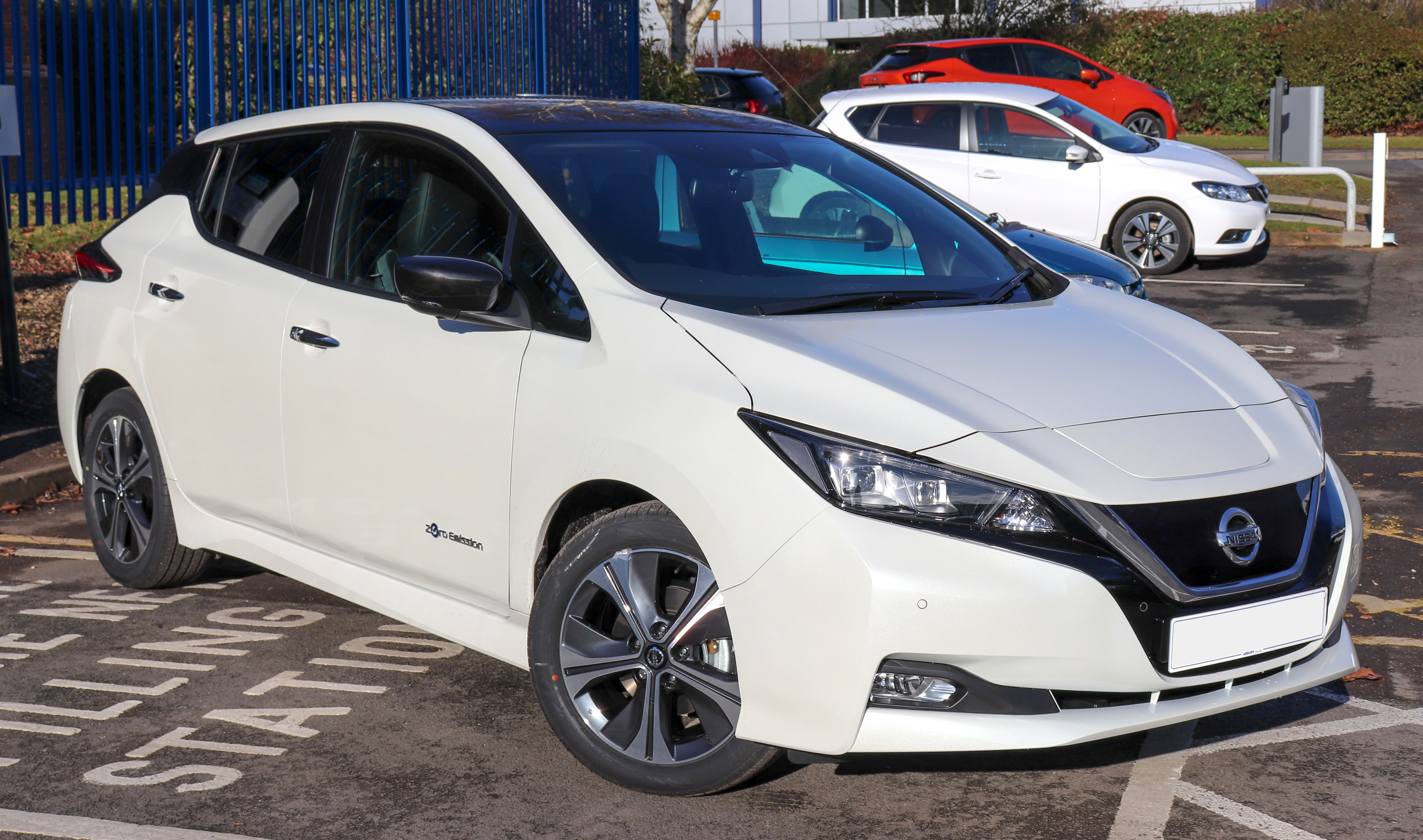
The Nissan Leaf was the world's top selling highway-capable all-electric car until December 2019.

Battery powered cars had primarily used lead-acid batteries and NiMH batteries. Lead-acid batteries' recharge capacity is considerably reduced if they're discharged beyond 75% on a regular basis, making them a less-than-ideal solution. NiMH batteries are a better choice, but are considerably more expensive than lead-acid. Lithium-ion battery powered vehicles such as the Venturi Fetish and the Tesla Roadster have recently demonstrated excellent performance and range, and nevertheless is used in most mass production models launched since December 2010.

Expanding on traditional lithium-ion batteries predominately used in today's battery electric vehicles, is an emerging science that is paving the way to utilize a carbon fiber structure (a vehicle body or chassis in this case) as a structural battery. Experiments being conducted at the Chalmers University of Technology in Sweden are showing that when coupled with Lithium-ion insertion mechanisms, an enhanced carbon fiber structure can have electromechanical properties. This means that the carbon fiber structure itself can act as its own battery/power source for propulsion. This would negate the need for traditional heavy battery banks, reducing weight and therefore increasing fuel efficiency.

As of December 2015, several neighborhood electric vehicles, city electric cars and series production highway-capable electric cars and utility vans have been made available for retails sales, including Tesla Roadster, GEM cars, Buddy, Mitsubishi i MiEV and its rebadged versions Peugeot iOn and Citroën C-Zero, Chery QQ3 EV, JAC J3 EV, Nissan Leaf, Smart ED, Mia electric, BYD e6, Renault Kangoo Z.E., Bolloré Bluecar, Renault Fluence Z.E., Ford Focus Electric, BMW ActiveE, Renault Twizy, Tesla Model S, Honda Fit EV, RAV4 EV second generation, Renault Zoe, Mitsubishi Minicab MiEV, Roewe E50, Chevrolet Spark EV, Fiat 500e, BMW i3, Volkswagen e-Up!, Nissan e-NV200, Volkswagen e-Golf, Mercedes-Benz B-Class Electric Drive, Kia Soul EV, BYD e5, and Tesla Model X. The world's all-time top selling highway legal electric car is the Nissan Leaf, released in December 2010, with global sales of more than 250,000 units through December 2016. The Tesla Model S, released in June 2012, ranks second with global sales of over 158,000 cars delivered as of December 2016. The Renault Kangoo Z.E. utility van is the leader of the light-duty all-electric segment with global sales of 25,205 units through December 2016.

==== Plug-in hybrid ====
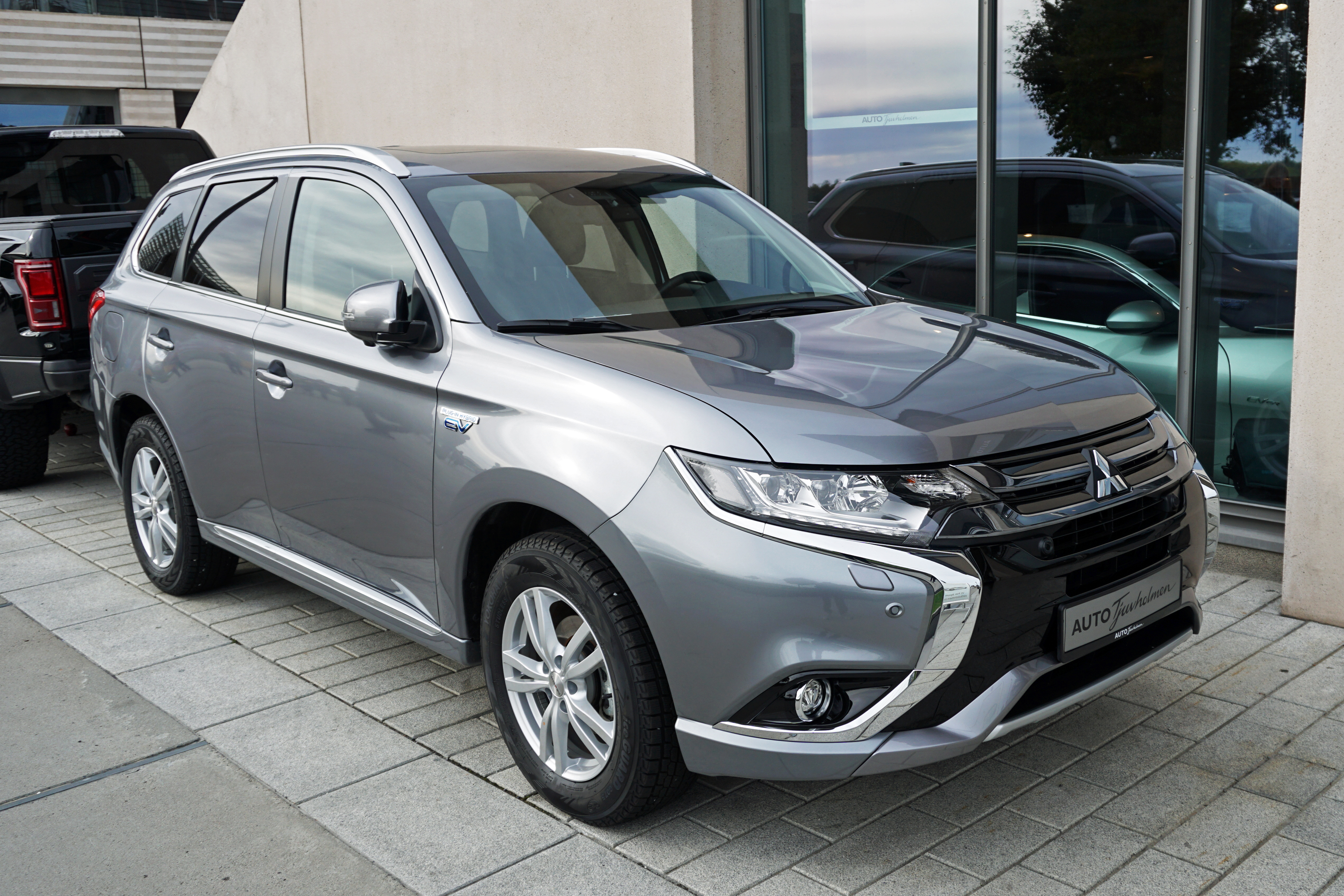
The Mitsubishi Outlander P-HEV is the world's all-time best selling plug-in hybrid with 270,000 units sold through December 2020.

Plug-in hybrid electric vehicles (PHEVs) use batteries to power an electric motor, as well as another fuel, such as gasoline or diesel, to power an internal combustion engine or other propulsion source. PHEVs can charge their batteries through charging equipment and regenerative braking. Using electricity from the grid to run the vehicle some or all of the time reduces operating costs and fuel use, relative to conventional vehicles.

Until 2010 most plug-in hybrids on the road in the U.S. were conversions of conventional hybrid electric vehicles, and the most prominent PHEVs were conversions of 2004 or later Toyota Prius, which have had plug-in charging and more batteries added and their electric-only range extended. Chinese battery manufacturer and automaker BYD Auto released the F3DM to the Chinese fleet market in December 2008 and began sales to the general public in Shenzhen in March 2010. General Motors began deliveries of the Chevrolet Volt in the U.S. in December 2010. Deliveries to retail customers of the Fisker Karma began in the U.S. in November 2011.

During 2012, the Toyota Prius Plug-in Hybrid, Ford C-Max Energi, and Volvo V60 Plug-in Hybrid were released. The following models were launched during 2013 and 2015: Honda Accord Plug-in Hybrid, Mitsubishi Outlander P-HEV, Ford Fusion Energi, McLaren P1 (limited edition), Porsche Panamera S E-Hybrid, BYD Qin, Cadillac ELR, BMW i3 REx, BMW i8, Porsche 918 Spyder (limited production), Volkswagen XL1 (limited production), Audi A3 Sportback e-tron, Volkswagen Golf GTE, Mercedes-Benz S 500 e, Porsche Cayenne S E-Hybrid, Mercedes-Benz C 350 e, BYD Tang, Volkswagen Passat GTE, Volvo XC90 T8, BMW X5 xDrive40e, Hyundai Sonata PHEV, and Volvo S60L PHEV.

As of December 2015, about 500,000 highway-capable plug-in hybrid electric cars had been sold worldwide since December 2008, out of total cumulative global sales of 1.2 million light-duty plug-in electric vehicles. As of December 2016, the Volt/Ampera family of plug-in hybrids, with combined sales of about 134,500 units is the top selling plug-in hybrid in the world. Ranking next are the Mitsubishi Outlander P-HEV with about 119,500, and the Toyota Prius Plug-in Hybrid with almost 78,000.

==== Bioalcohol and ethanol ====
The first commercial vehicle that used ethanol as a fuel was the Ford Model T, produced from 1908 through 1927. It was fitted with a carburetor with adjustable jetting, allowing use of gasoline or ethanol, or a combination of both. Other car manufactures also provided engines for ethanol fuel use. In the United States, alcohol fuel was produced in corn-alcohol stills until Prohibition criminalized the production of alcohol in 1919. The use of alcohol as a fuel for internal combustion engines, either alone or in combination with other fuels, lapsed until the oil price shocks of the 1970s. Furthermore, additional attention was gained because of its possible environmental and long-term economical advantages over fossil fuel.

Both ethanol and methanol have been used as an automotive fuel. While both can be obtained from petroleum or natural gas, ethanol has attracted more attention because it is considered a renewable resource, easily obtained from sugar or starch in crops and other agricultural produce such as grain, sugarcane, sugar beets or even lactose. Since ethanol occurs in nature whenever yeast happens to find a sugar solution such as overripe fruit, most organisms have evolved some tolerance to ethanol, whereas methanol is toxic. Other experiments involve butanol, which can also be produced by fermentation of plants. Support for ethanol comes from the fact that it is a biomass fuel, which addresses climate change and greenhouse gas emissions, though these benefits are now highly debated, including the heated 2008 food vs fuel debate.

Most modern cars are designed to run on gasoline are capable of running with a blend from 10% up to 15% ethanol mixed into gasoline (E10-E15). With a small amount of redesign, gasoline-powered vehicles can run on ethanol concentrations as high as 85% (E85), the maximum set in the United States and Europe due to cold weather during the winter, or up to 100% (E100) in Brazil, with a warmer climate. Ethanol has close to 34% less energy per volume than gasoline, consequently fuel economy ratings with ethanol blends are significantly lower than with pure gasoline, but this lower energy content does not translate directly into a 34% reduction in mileage, because there are many other variables that affect the performance of a particular fuel in a particular engine, and also because ethanol has a higher octane rating which is beneficial to high compression ratio engines.

For this reason, for pure or high ethanol blends to be attractive for users, its price must be lower than gasoline to offset the lower fuel economy. As a rule of thumb, Brazilian consumers are frequently advised by the local media to use more alcohol than gasoline in their mix only when ethanol prices are 30% lower or more than gasoline, as ethanol price fluctuates heavily depending on the results and seasonal harvests of sugar cane and by region. In the US, and based on EPA tests for all 2006 E85 models, the average fuel economy for E85 vehicles was found 25.56% lower than unleaded gasoline. The EPA-rated mileage of current American flex-fuel vehicles could be considered when making price comparisons, though E85 has octane rating of about 104 and could be used as a substitute for premium gasoline. Regional retail E85 prices vary widely across the US, with more favorable prices in the Midwest region, where most corn is grown and ethanol produced. In August 2008 the US average spread between the price of E85 and gasoline was 16.9%, while in Indiana was 35%, 30% in Minnesota and Wisconsin, 19% in Maryland, 12 to 15% in California, and just 3% in Utah. Depending on the vehicle capabilities, the break even price of E85 usually has to be between 25 and 30% lower than gasoline.

Reacting to the high price of oil and its growing dependence on imports, in 1975 Brazil launched the Pro-alcool program, a huge government-subsidized effort to manufacture ethanol fuel (from its sugar cane crop) and ethanol-powered automobiles. These ethanol-only vehicles were very popular in the 1980s, but became economically impractical when oil prices fell – and sugar prices rose – late in that decade. In May 2003 Volkswagen built for the first time a commercial ethanol flexible fuel car, the Gol 1.6 Total Flex. These vehicles were a commercial success and by early 2009 nine other Brazilian manufacturers are producing flexible fuel vehicles: Chevrolet, Fiat, Ford, Peugeot, Renault, Honda, Mitsubishi, Toyota, Citroën, and Nissan. The adoption of the flex technology was so rapid, that flexible fuel cars reached 87.6% of new car sales in July 2008. As of August 2008, the fleet of "flex" automobiles and light commercial vehicles had reached 6 million new vehicles sold, representing almost 19% of all registered light vehicles. The rapid success of "flex" vehicles, as they are popularly known, was made possible by the existence of 33,000 filling stations with at least one ethanol pump available by 2006, a heritage of the Pro-alcool program.

In the United States, initial support to develop alternative fuels by the government was also a response to the 1973 oil crisis, and later on, as a goal to improve air quality. Also, liquid fuels were preferred over gaseous fuels not only because they have a better volumetric energy density but also because they were the most compatible fuels with existing distribution systems and engines, thus avoiding a big departure from the existing technologies and taking advantage of the vehicle and the refueling infrastructure. California led the search of sustainable alternatives with interest in methanol. In 1996, a new FFV Ford Taurus was developed, with models fully capable of running either methanol or ethanol blended with gasoline. This ethanol version of the Taurus was the first commercial production of an E85 FFV. The momentum of the FFV production programs at the American car companies continued, although by the end of the 1990s, the emphasis was on the FFV E85 version, as it is today. Ethanol was preferred over methanol because there is a large support in the farming community and thanks to government's incentive programs and corn-based ethanol subsidies. Sweden also tested both the M85 and the E85 flexifuel vehicles, but due to agriculture policy, in the end emphasis was given to the ethanol flexifuel vehicles.

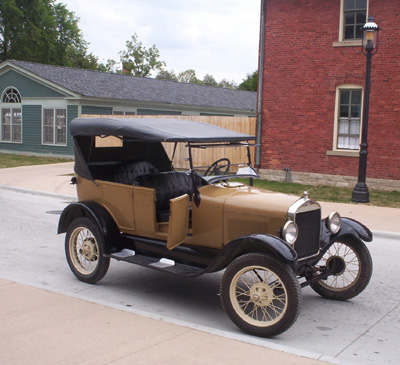
The Ford Model T was the first commercial flex-fuel vehicle. The engine was capable of running on gasoline or ethanol, or a mix of both.

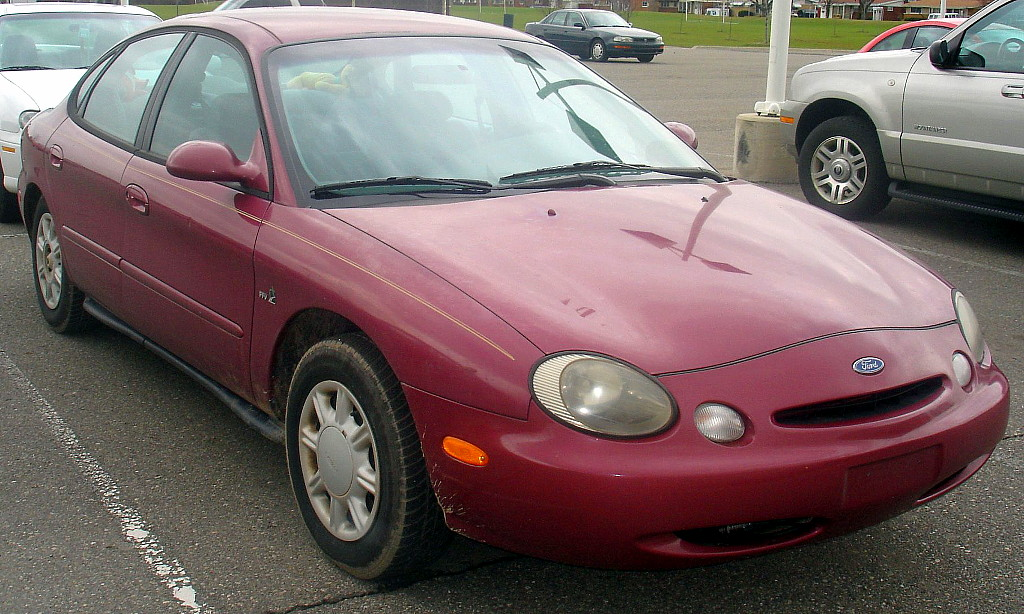
The 1996 Ford Taurus was the first flexible-fuel vehicle produced with versions capable of running with either ethanol (E85) or methanol (M85) blended with gasoline.

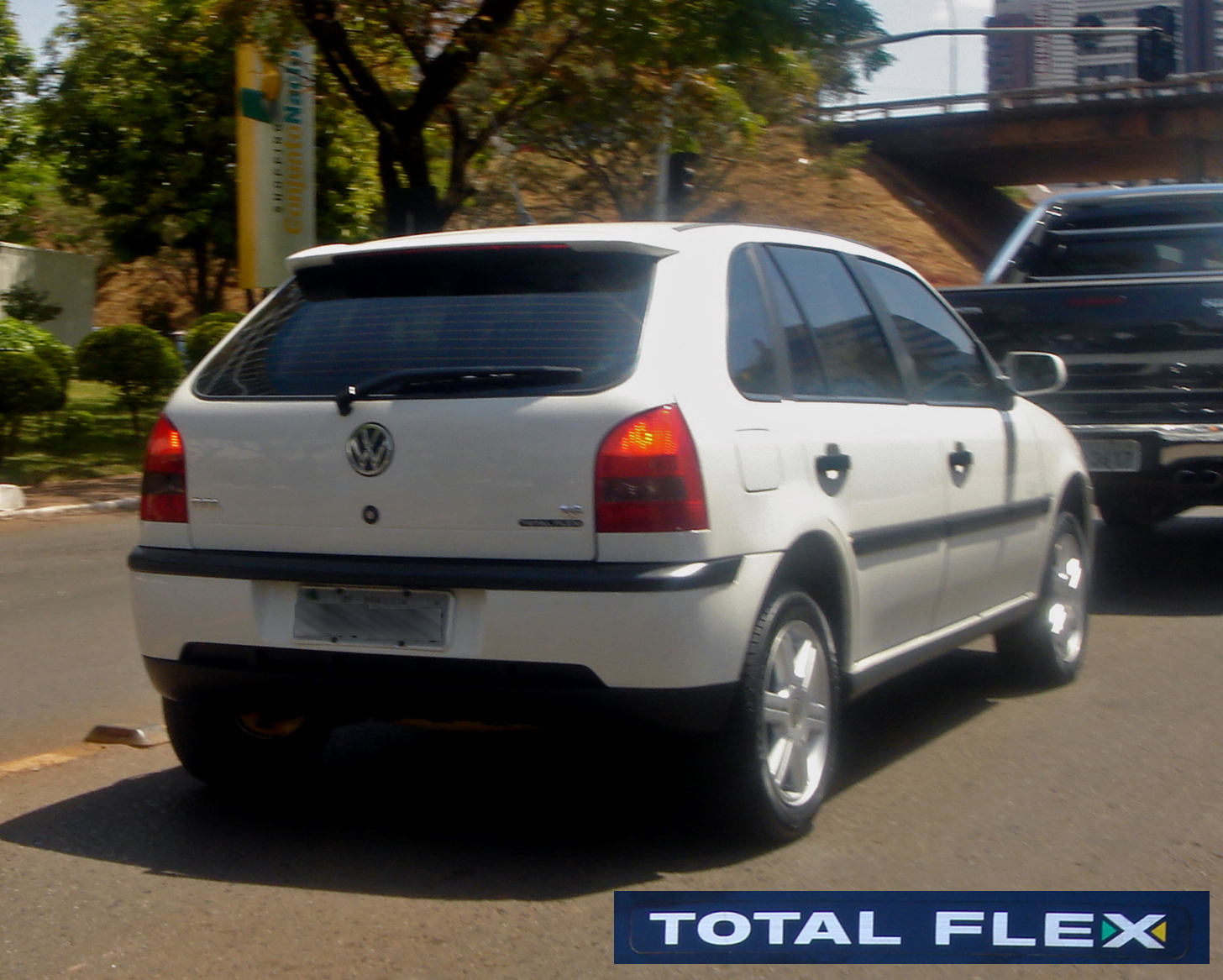
The 2003 VW Gol 1.6 Total Flex was the first commercial flexible-fuel vehicle in the Brazilian market, capable of running on any mixture of gasoline (E20 to E25 blend) and ethanol (E100).

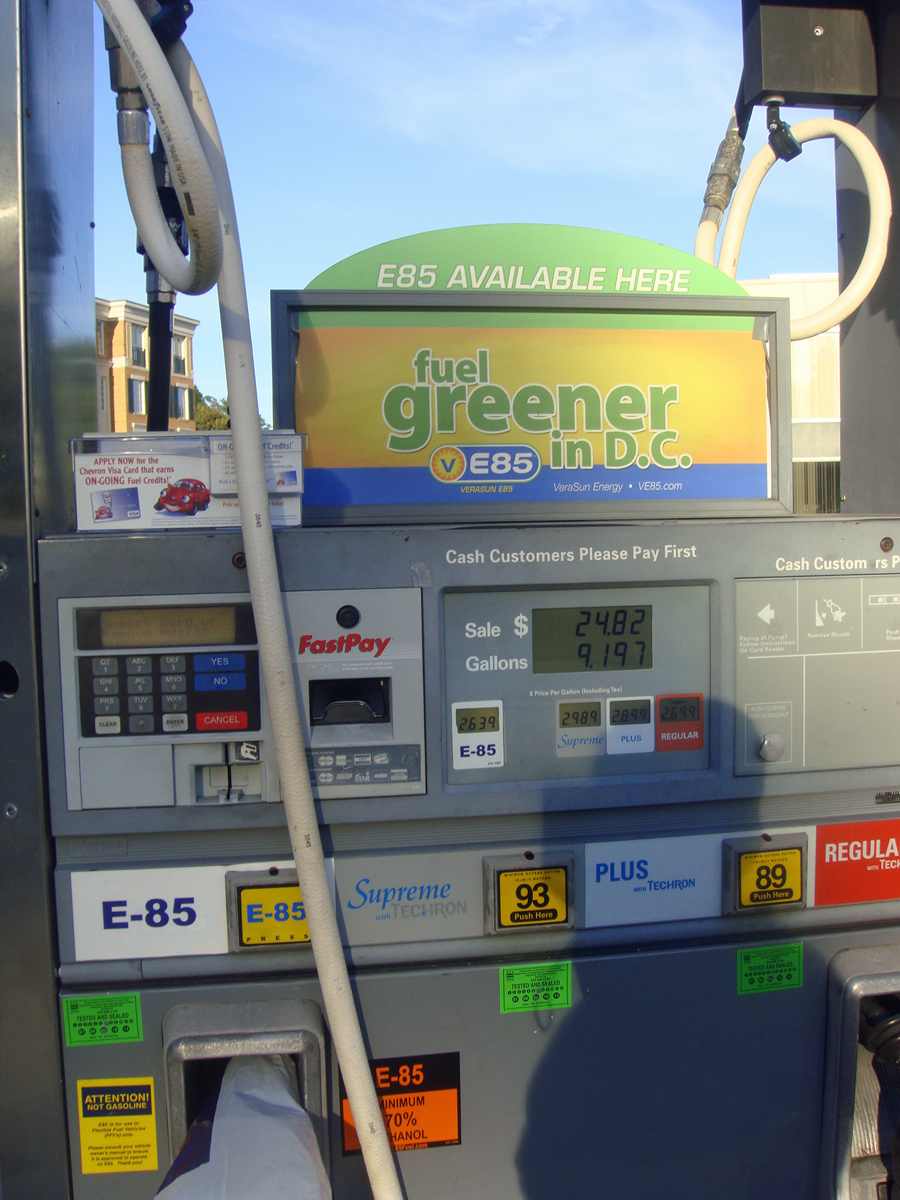
E85 fuel sold at a regular gasoline station in Washington, D.C.

==== Biodiesel ====
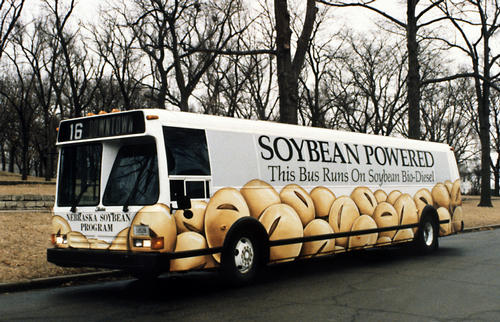
Bus running on soybean biodiesel

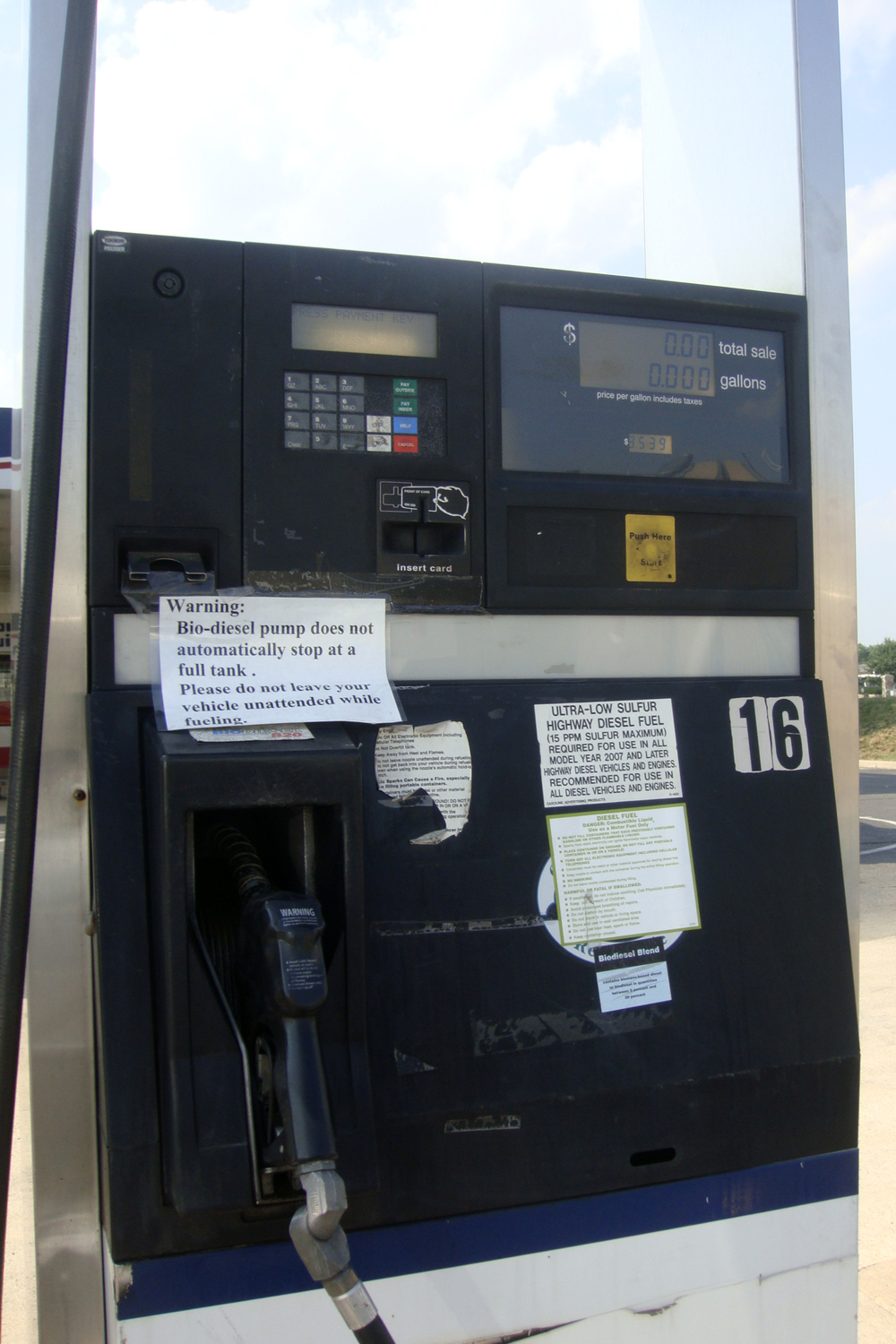
Biodiesel (B20) pump in the U.S.

The main benefit of diesel combustion engines is that they have a 44% fuel burn efficiency; compared with just 25–30% in the best gasoline engines. In addition diesel fuel has slightly higher energy density by volume than gasoline. This makes diesel engines capable of achieving much better fuel economy than gasoline vehicles.

Biodiesel (fatty acid methyl ester), is commercially available in most oilseed-producing states in the United States. As of 2005, it is somewhat more expensive than fossil diesel, though it is still commonly produced in relatively small quantities (in comparison to petroleum products and ethanol). Many farmers who raise oilseeds use a biodiesel blend in tractors and equipment as a matter of policy, to foster production of biodiesel and raise public awareness. It is sometimes easier to find biodiesel in rural areas than in cities. Biodiesel has lower energy density than fossil diesel fuel, so biodiesel vehicles are not quite able to keep up with the fuel economy of a fossil fuelled diesel vehicle, if the diesel injection system is not reset for the new fuel. If the injection timing is changed to take account of the higher cetane value of biodiesel, the difference in economy is negligible. Because biodiesel contains more oxygen than diesel or vegetable oil fuel, it produces the lowest emissions from diesel engines, and is lower in most emissions than gasoline engines. Biodiesel has a higher lubricity than mineral diesel and is an additive in European pump diesel for lubricity and emissions reduction.

Some diesel-powered cars can run with minor modifications on 100% pure vegetable oils. Vegetable oils tend to thicken (or solidify if it is waste cooking oil), in cold weather conditions so vehicle modifications (a two tank system with diesel start/stop tank), are essential in order to heat the fuel prior to use under most circumstances. Heating to the temperature of engine coolant reduces fuel viscosity, to the range cited by injection system manufacturers, for systems prior to 'common rail' or 'unit injection ( VW PD)' systems. Waste vegetable oil, especially if it has been used for a long time, may become hydrogenated and have increased acidity. This can cause the thickening of fuel, gumming in the engine and acid damage of the fuel system. Biodiesel does not have this problem, because it is chemically processed to be PH neutral and lower viscosity. Modern low emission diesels (most often Euro -3 and -4 compliant), typical of the current production in the European industry, would require extensive modification of injector system, pumps and seals etc. due to the higher operating pressures, that are designed thinner (heated) mineral diesel than ever before, for atomisation, if they were to use pure vegetable oil as fuel. Vegetable oil fuel is not suitable for these vehicles as they are currently produced. This reduces the market as increasing numbers of new vehicles are not able to use it. However, the German Elsbett company has successfully produced single tank vegetable oil fuel systems for several decades, and has worked with Volkswagen on their TDI engines. This shows that it is technologically possible to use vegetable oil as a fuel in high efficiency / low emission diesel engines.

Greasestock is an event held yearly in Yorktown Heights, New York, and is one of the largest showcases of vehicles using waste oil as a biofuel in the United States.

==== Biogas ====
Compressed biogas may be used for internal combustion engines after purification of the raw gas. The removal of H_{2}O, H_{2}S and particles can be seen as standard producing a gas which has the same quality as compressed natural gas.

=== Compressed natural gas ===
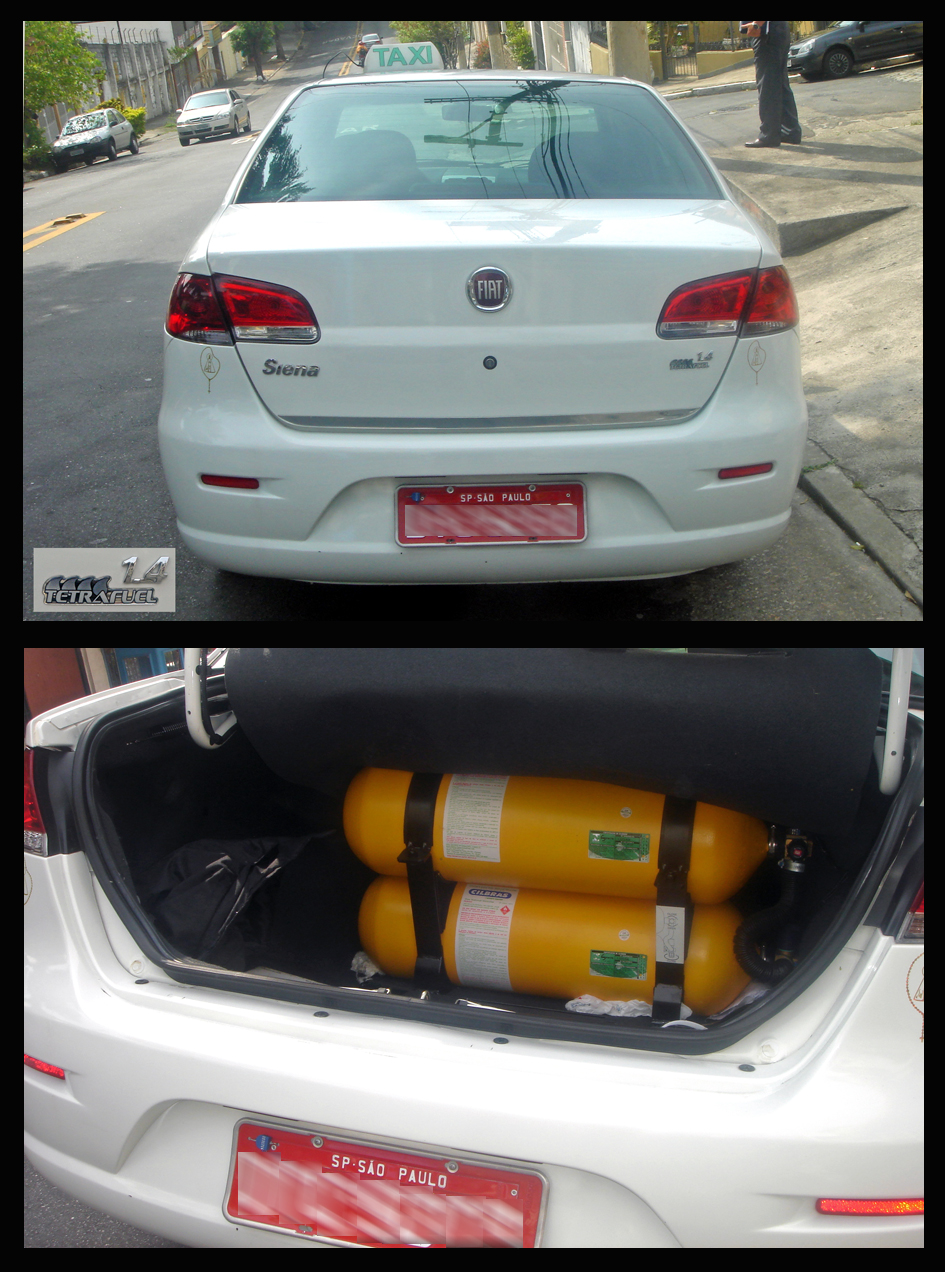
The Brazilian Fiat Siena Tetrafuel 1.4, the first multifuel car that runs as a flexible-fuel on pure gasoline, or E25, or E100; or runs as a bi-fuel with natural gas (CNG).

High-pressure compressed natural gas (CNG), mainly composed of methane, that is used to fuel normal combustion engines instead of gasoline. Combustion of methane produces the least amount of CO_{2} of all fossil fuels. Gasoline cars can be retrofitted to CNG and become bifuel Natural gas vehicles (NGVs) as the gasoline tank is kept. The driver can switch between CNG and gasoline during operation. Natural gas vehicles (NGVs) are popular in regions or countries where natural gas is abundant. Widespread use began in the Po River Valley of Italy, and later became very popular in New Zealand by the eighties, though its use has declined.

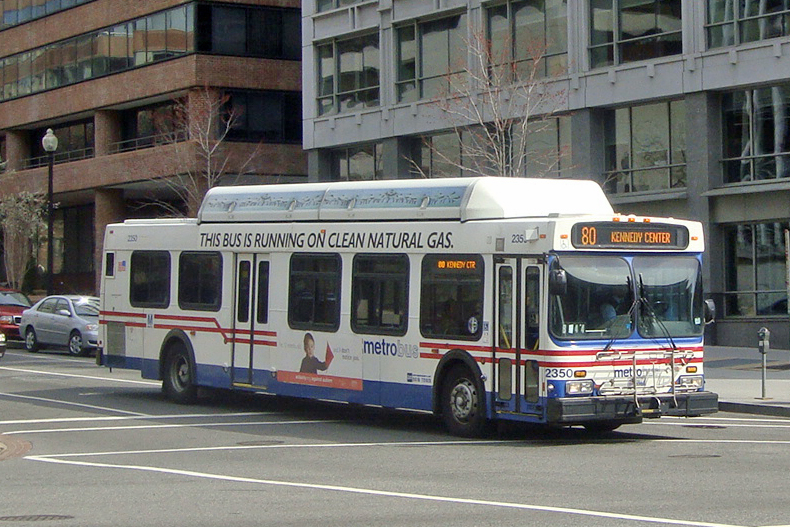
Buses powered with CNG are common in the United States.

As of 2017, there were 24.5 million natural gas vehicles worldwide, led by China (5.35 million) followed by Iran (4.0 million), India (3.05 million), Pakistan (3 million), Argentina (2.3 million), and Brazil (1.78 million).

As of 2010, the Asia-Pacific region led the global market with a share of 54%. In Europe they are popular in Italy (730,000), Ukraine (200,000), Armenia (101,352), Russia (100,000) and Germany (91,500), and they are becoming more so as various manufacturers produce factory made cars, buses, vans and heavy vehicles. In the United States CNG powered buses are the favorite choice of several public transit agencies, with an estimated CNG bus fleet of some 130,000. Other countries where CNG-powered buses are popular include India, Australia, Argentina, and Germany.

CNG vehicles are common in South America, where these vehicles are mainly used as taxicabs in main cities of Argentina and Brazil. Normally, standard gasoline vehicles are retrofitted in specialized shops, which involve installing the gas cylinder in the trunk and the CNG injection system and electronics. The Brazilian GNV fleet is concentrated in the cities of Rio de Janeiro and São Paulo. Pike Research reports that almost 90% of NGVs in Latin America have bi-fuel engines, allowing these vehicles to run on either gasoline or CNG.

==== Dual fuel ====
Dual fuel vehicle is referred as the vehicle using two types of fuel in the same time (can be gas + liquid, gas + gas, liquid + liquid) with different fuel tank.

Diesel-CNG dual fuel is a system using two type of fuel which are diesel and compressed natural gas (CNG) at the same time. It is because of CNG need a source of ignition for combustion in diesel engine.

=== Hybrid electric ===
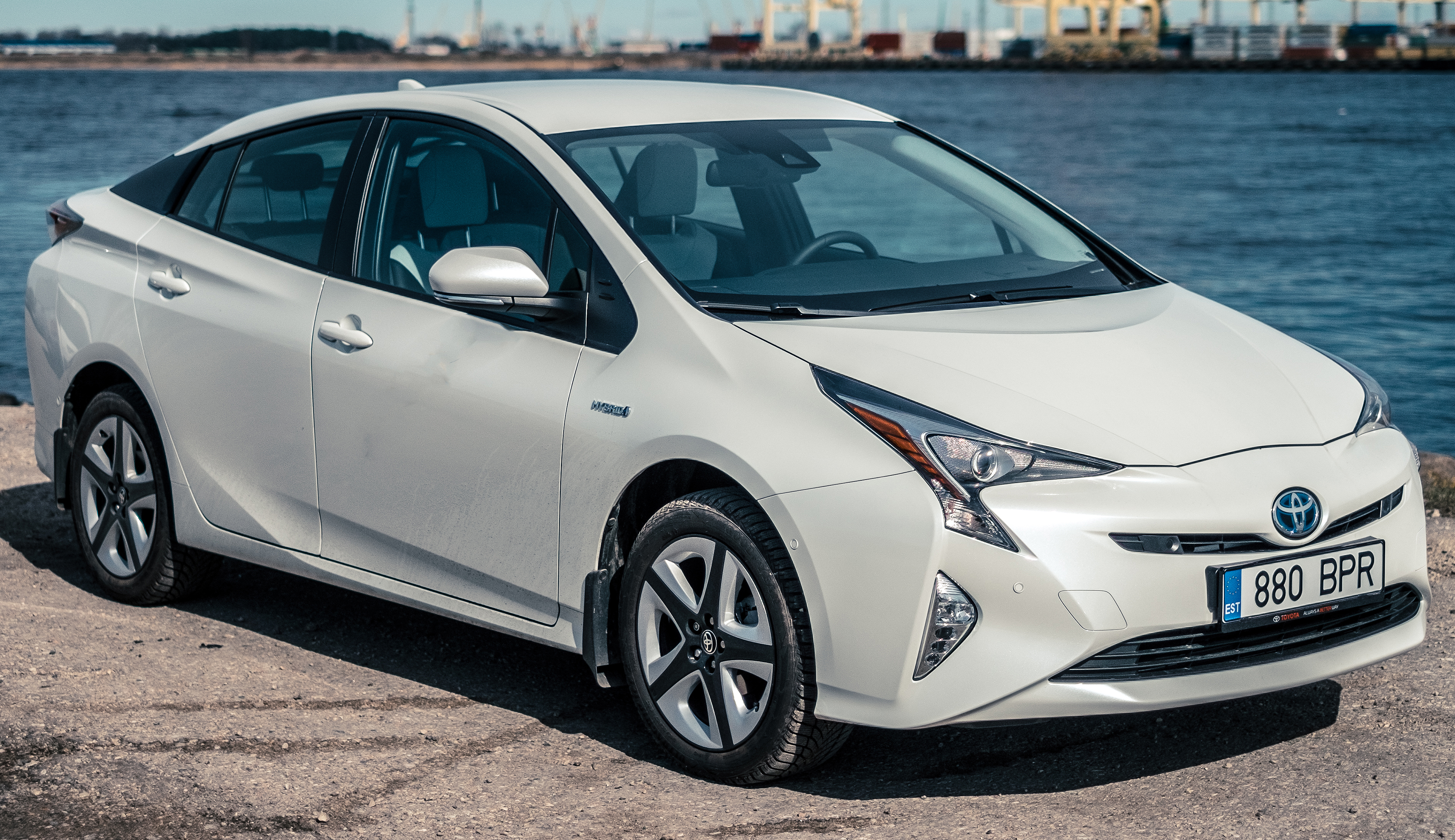
The Toyota Prius is the world's best-selling hybrid electric vehicle, with global sales of almost 4 million units through January 2017.

A hybrid vehicle uses multiple propulsion systems to provide motive power. The most common type of hybrid vehicle is the gasoline-electric hybrid vehicles, which use gasoline (petrol) and electric batteries for the energy used to power internal-combustion engines (ICEs) and electric motors. These motors are usually relatively small and would be considered "underpowered" by themselves, but they can provide a normal driving experience when used in combination during acceleration and other maneuvers that require greater power.

The Toyota Prius first went on sale in Japan in 1997 and it is sold worldwide since 2000.

As of January 2017, there are over 50 models of hybrid electric cars available in several world markets, with more than 12 million hybrid electric vehicles sold worldwide since their inception in 1997.

=== Hydrogen ===
A hydrogen car is an automobile which uses hydrogen as its primary source of power for locomotion. These cars generally use the hydrogen in one of two methods: combustion or fuel-cell conversion. In combustion, the hydrogen is "burned" in engines in fundamentally the same method as traditional gasoline cars. The common internal combustion engine, usually fueled with gasoline (petrol) or diesel liquids, can be converted to run on gaseous hydrogen. This emits water at the point of use, and during combustion with air NOx can be produced. However, the most efficient use of hydrogen involves the use of fuel cells and electric motors instead of a traditional engine. Hydrogen reacts with oxygen inside the fuel cells, which produces electricity to power the motors, with the only byproduct from the spent hydrogen being water.

A small number of commercially available hydrogen fuel cell cars currently exist: the Hyundai NEXO, Toytota Mirai, and previously the Honda FCX Clarity. One primary area of research is hydrogen storage, to try to increase the range of hydrogen vehicles while reducing the weight, energy consumption, and complexity of the storage systems. Two primary methods of storage are metal hydrides and compression. Some believe that hydrogen cars will never be economically viable and that the emphasis on this technology is a diversion from the development and popularization of more efficient battery electric vehicles.

In the light road vehicle segment, by the end of 2022, 70,200 hydrogen fuel cell electric vehicles had been sold worldwide, compared with 26 million plug-in electric vehicles. With the rapid rise of electric vehicles and associated battery technology and infrastructure, the global scope for hydrogen's role in cars is shrinking relative to earlier expectations.

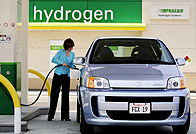
Hydrogen fueling station in California

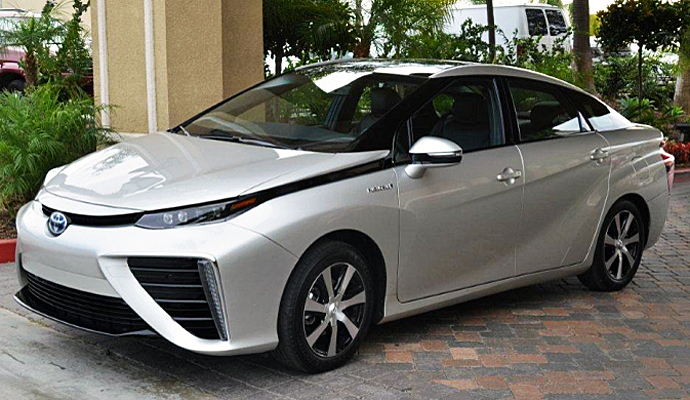
The Toyota Mirai is one of the first hydrogen fuel-cell vehicles to be sold commercially to retail customers, initially, only in Japan and California.

=== Electric, fed by external source ===
Electric power fed from an external source to the vehicle is standard in railway electrification. At such systems usually the tracks form one pole, while the other is usually a single overhead wire or a rail insulated against ground.

On roads this system does not work as described, as normal road surfaces are very poor electric conductors; and so electric vehicles fed with external power on roads require at least two overhead wires. The most common type of road vehicles fed with electricity from external source are trolleybusses, but there are also some trucks powered with this technology. The advantage is that the vehicle can be operated without breaks for refueling or charging. Disadvantages include: a large infrastructure of electric wires; difficulty in driving as one has to prevent a dewirement of the vehicle; vehicles cannot overtake each other; a danger of electrocution; and an aesthetic problem.

Wireless transmission (see Wireless power transfer) is possible, in principle; but the infrastructure (especially wiring) necessary for inductive or capacitive coupling would be extensive and expensive. In principle it is also possible to transmit energy by microwaves or by lasers to the vehicle, but this may be inefficient and dangerous for the power required. Beside this, in the case of lasers one requires a guidance system to track the vehicle to be powered, as laser beams have a small diameter.

== Comparative assessment of fossil and alternative fuels ==
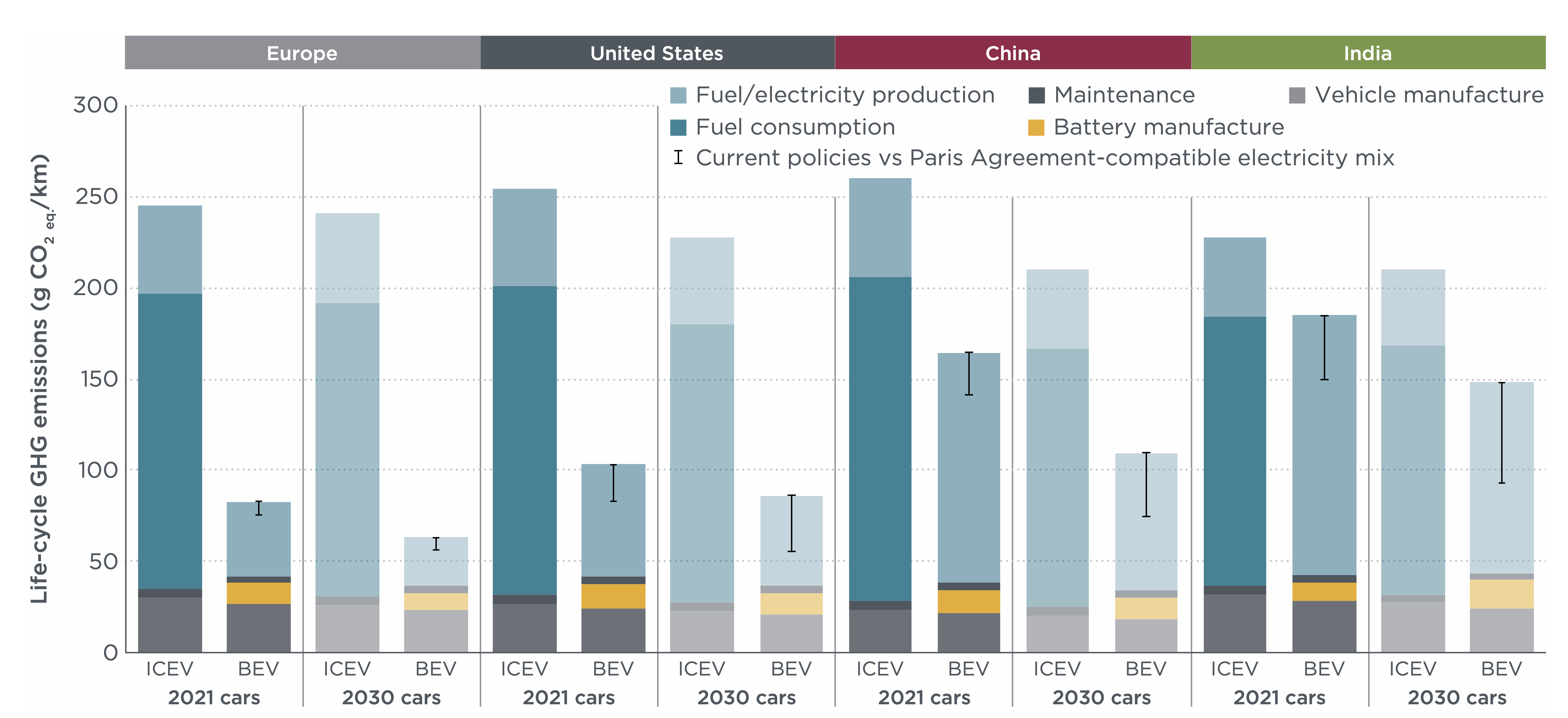
Even in countries where electricity is largely generated from coal, such as China and India, battery-electric vehicles (BEVs) have lower lifecycle greenhouse gas emissions. The advantages of BEVs will further increase by 2030 as countries increasingly adopt clean electricity sources.

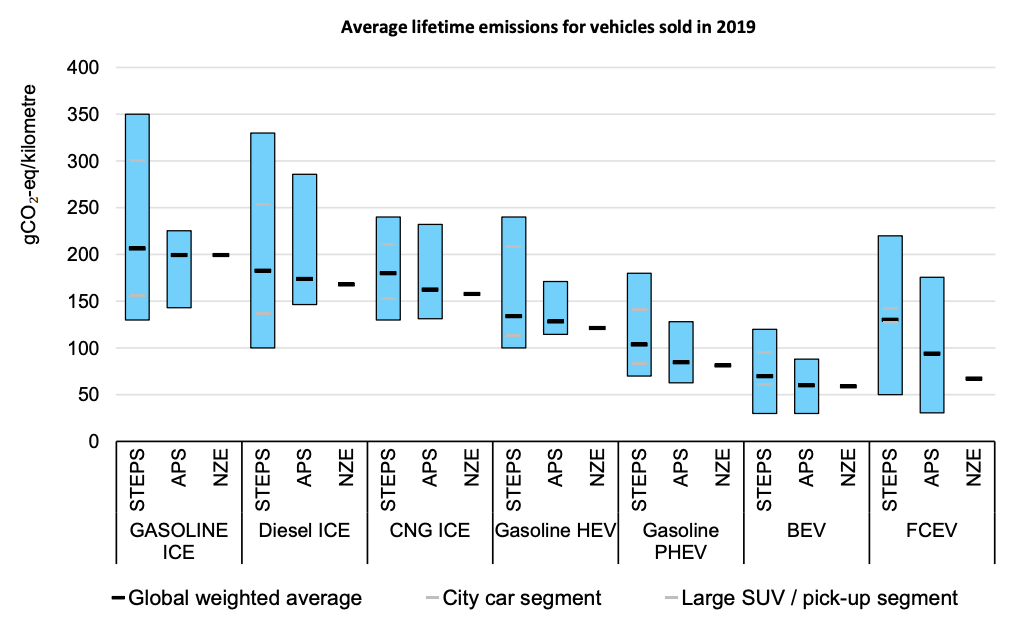
Battery electric vehicles have lower lifecycle emissions than other vehicle types. Abbreviations used in this chart: ICE(V): internal combustion engine vehicle; CNG: compressed natural gas; HEV: hybrid electric vehicle; BEV: battery electric vehicle; PHEV: plugin hybrid electric vehicle; FCEV: fuel cell vehicle; STEPS: IEA's Stated Policies Scenario; APS: IEA's Announced Pledges Scenario; NZE: IEA's Net Zero Emissions by 2050 Scenario.

Comparative assessments of conventional fossil and alternative fuel vehicles usually encompass more than in-use environmental impacts and running costs. They factor in issues like resource extractive impacts (e.g. for battery manufacture or fossil fuel extraction), 'well-to-wheel' efficiency, and the carbon intensity of electricity in different geographies. In general, the lifecycle greenhouse gas emissions of battery-electric vehicles are lower than emissions from hydrogen, PHEV, hybrid, compressed natural gas, gasoline, and diesel vehicles. BEVs have lower emissions than internal combustion engine vehicles even in places where electricity generation is relatively carbon-intensive, for example China where electricity is predominantly generated from coal.

== Other technologies ==
=== Engine air compressor ===
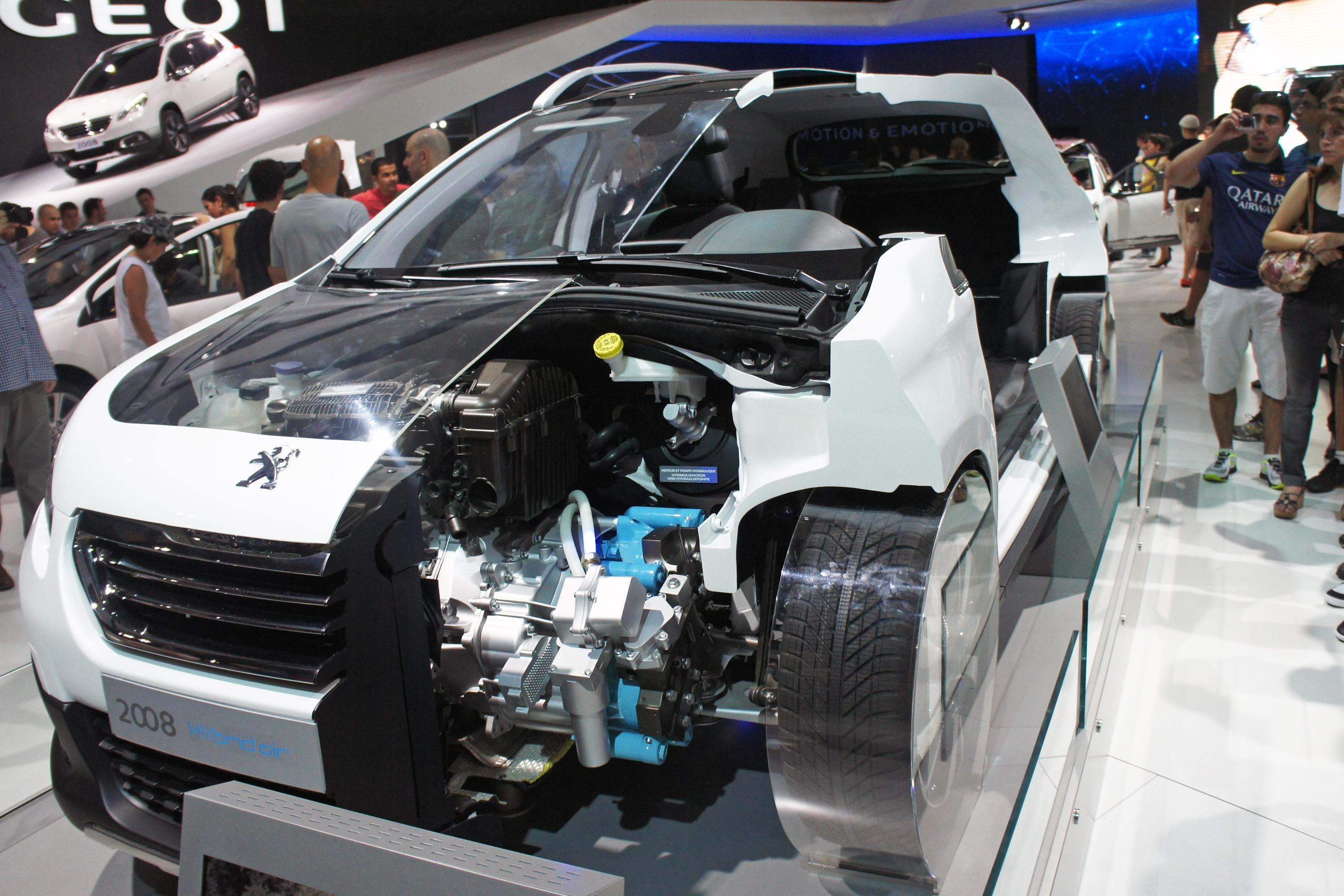
The Peugeot 2008 HYbrid air prototype replaced conventional hybrid batteries with a compressed air propulsion system.

The air engine is an emission-free piston engine that uses compressed air as a source of energy. The first compressed air car was invented by a French engineer named Guy Nègre. The expansion of compressed air may be used to drive the pistons in a modified piston engine. Efficiency of operation is gained through the use of environmental heat at normal temperature to warm the otherwise cold expanded air from the storage tank. This non-adiabatic expansion has the potential to greatly increase the efficiency of the machine. The only exhaust is cold air (−15 °C), which could also be used to air condition the car. The source for air is a pressurized carbon-fiber tank. Air is delivered to the engine via a rather conventional injection system. Unique crank design within the engine increases the time during which the air charge is warmed from ambient sources and a two-stage process allows improved heat transfer rates.

=== Electric, stored-otherway ===
Electricity can be also stored in supercapacitors and superconductors. However superconductor storage is unsuitable for vehicle propulsion as it requires extremely low temperatures and produces strong magnetic fields. Supercapacitors, however, can be used in vehicles and are used in some trams on sections without overhead wire. They can be charged during regular stops, while passengers enter and leave the train, but can only travel a few kilometres with the stored energy. However, this is no problem in this case as the next stop is usually in reachable distance.

=== Solar ===
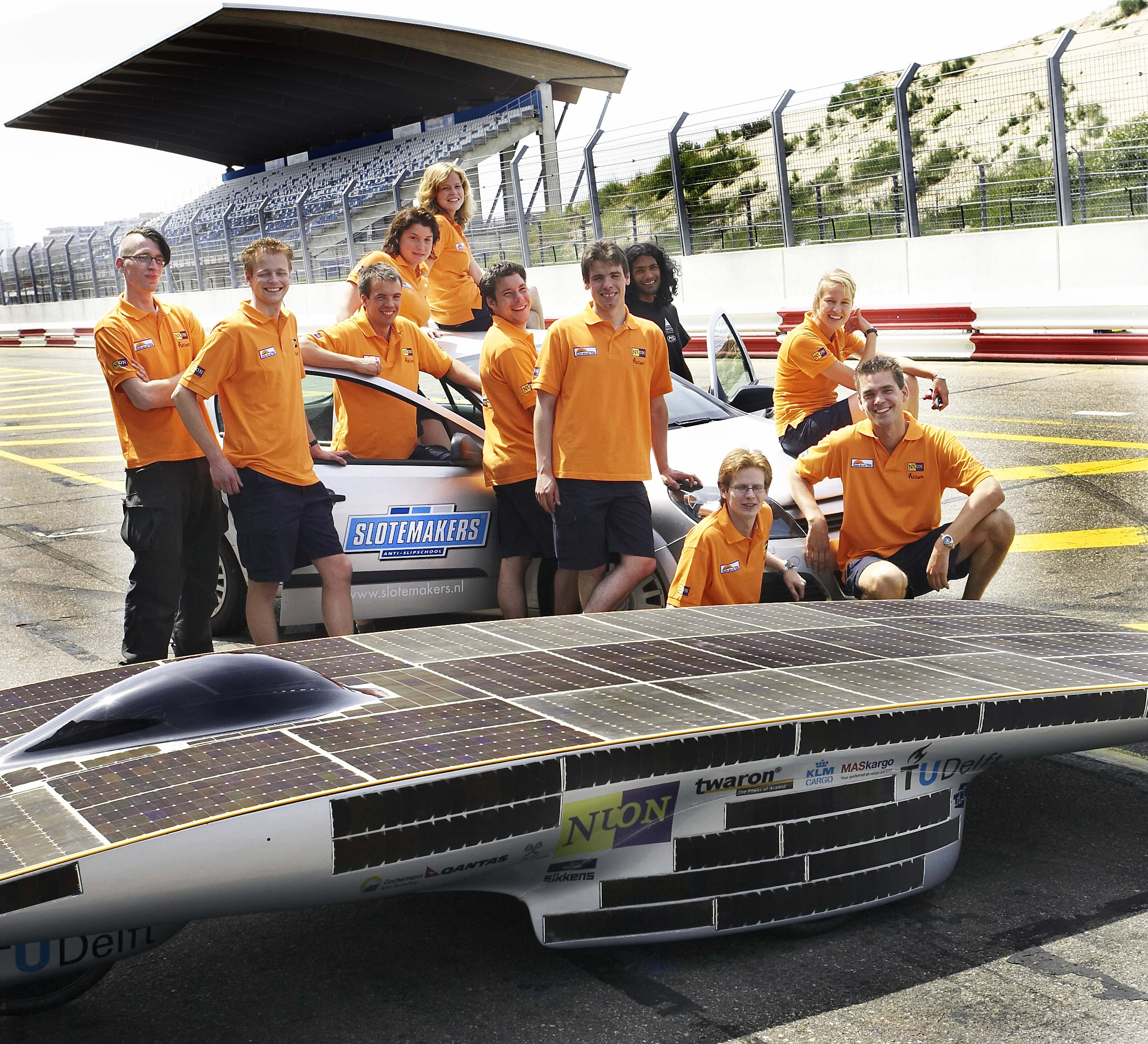
Nuna team at a racecourse.

A solar car is an electric vehicle powered by solar energy obtained from solar panels on the car. Solar panels cannot currently be used to directly supply a car with a suitable amount of power at this time, but they can be used to extend the range of electric vehicles. As of 2022, a handful of solar electric cars with varying performance are becoming commercially available, from Fisker and Lightyear, among others.

Solar cars are raced in competitions such as the World Solar Challenge and the North American Solar Challenge. These events are often sponsored by Government agencies such as the United States Department of Energy keen to promote the development of alternative energy technology such as solar cells and electric vehicles. Such challenges are often entered by universities to develop their students' engineering and technological skills as well as motor vehicle manufacturers such as GM and Honda.

=== Dimethyl ether fuel ===
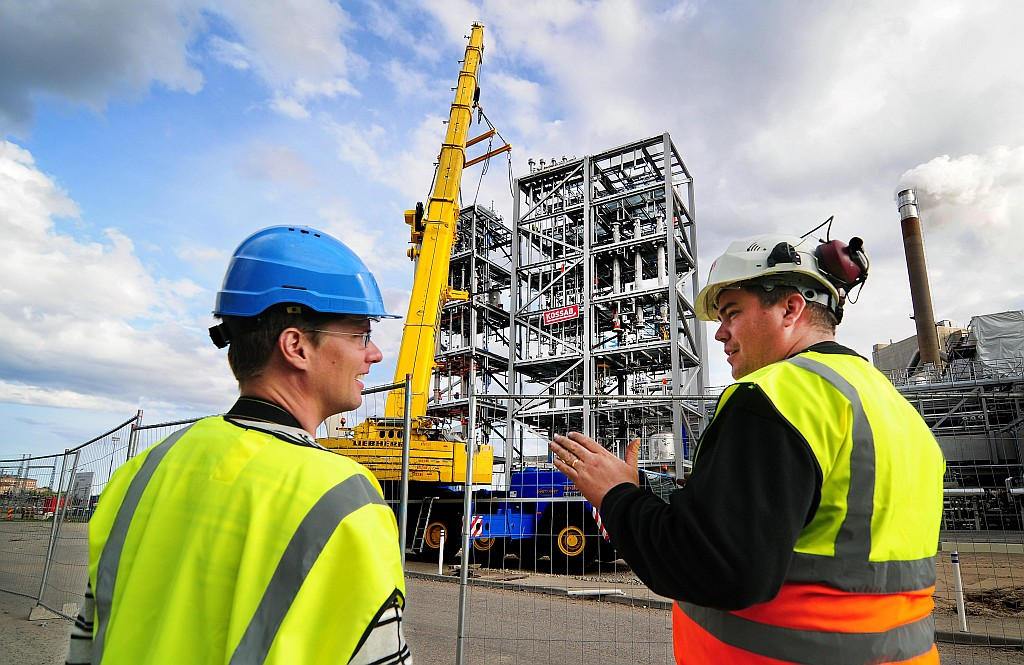
Installation of BioDME synthesis towers at Chemrec's pilot facility

Dimethyl ether (DME) is a promising fuel in diesel engines, petrol engines (30% DME / 70% LPG), and gas turbines owing to its high cetane number, which is 55, compared to diesel's, which is 40–53. Only moderate modifications are needed to convert a diesel engine to burn DME. The simplicity of this short carbon chain compound leads during combustion to very low emissions of particulate matter, NO_{x}, CO. For these reasons as well as being sulfur-free, DME meets even the most stringent emission regulations in Europe (EURO5), U.S. (U.S. 2010), and Japan (2009 Japan). Mobil is using DME in their methanol to gasoline process.

DME is being developed as a synthetic second generation biofuel (BioDME), which can be manufactured from lignocellulosic biomass. In 2006 the EU considered BioDME in its potential biofuel mix in 2030; the Volvo Group was the coordinator for the European Community Seventh Framework Programme project BioDME where Chemrec's BioDME pilot plant based on black liquor gasification is nearing completion in Piteå, Sweden.

=== Ammonia fuelled vehicles ===
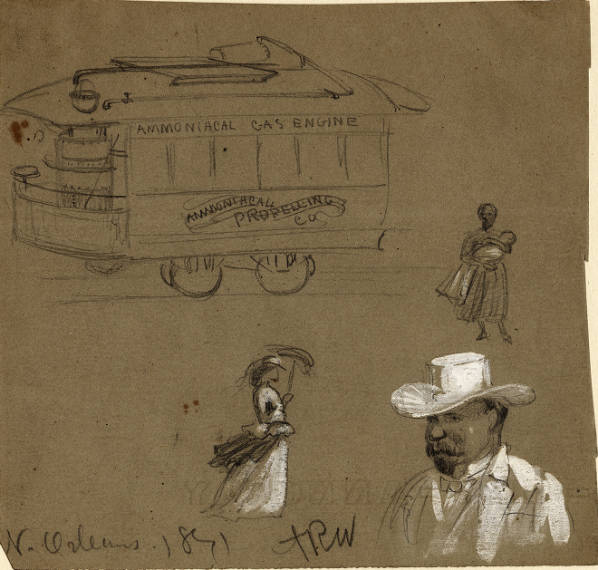
Ammoniacal gas engine streetcar in New Orleans drawn by Alfred Waud in 1871

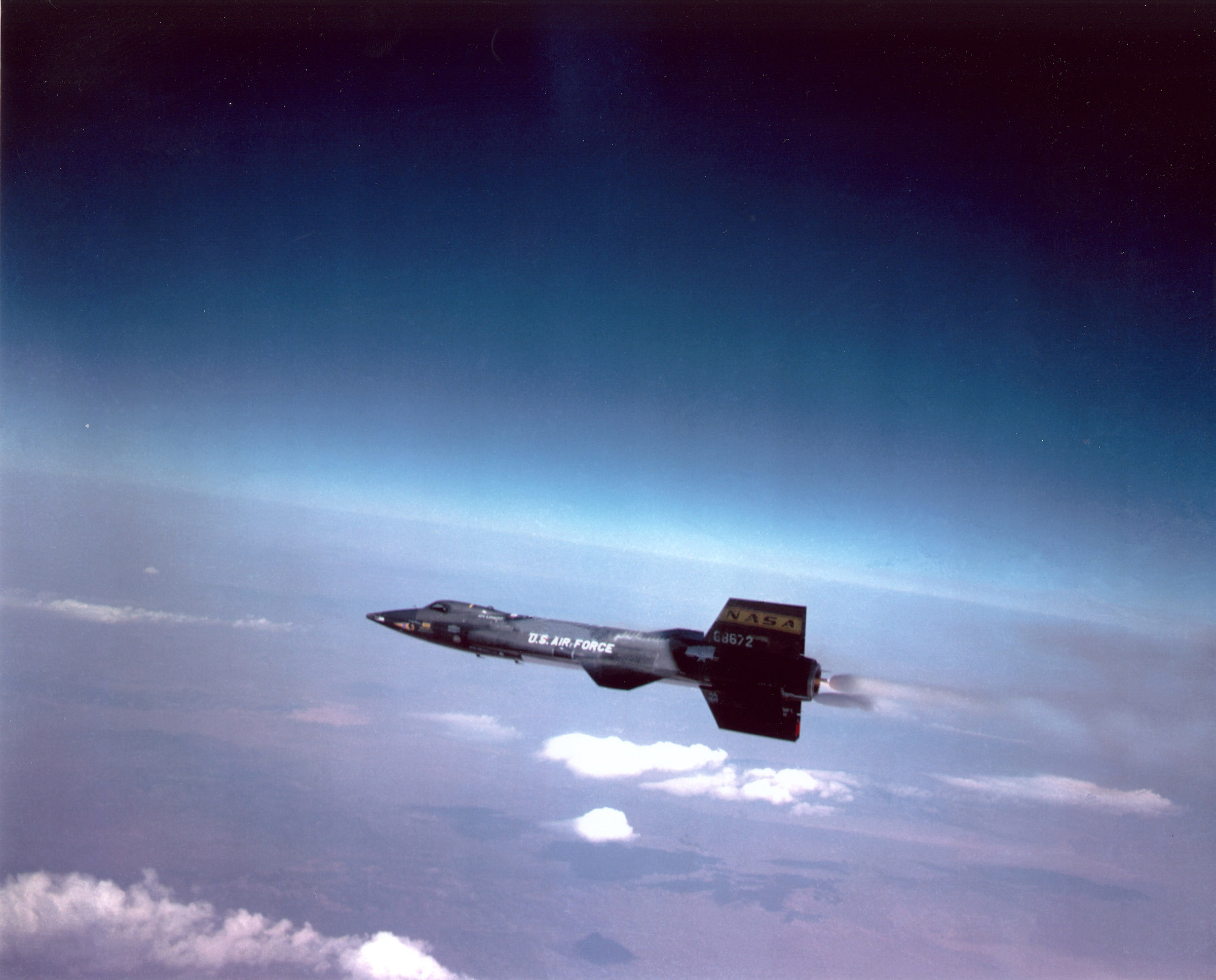
The X-15 aircraft used ammonia as one component fuel of its rocket engine.

Ammonia is produced by combining gaseous hydrogen with nitrogen from the air. Large-scale ammonia production uses natural gas for the source of hydrogen. Ammonia was used during World War II to power buses in Belgium, and in engine and solar energy applications prior to 1900. Liquid ammonia also fuelled the Reaction Motors XLR99 rocket engine, that powered the X-15 hypersonic research aircraft. Although not as powerful as other fuels, it left no soot in the reusable rocket engine and its density approximately matches the density of the oxidizer, liquid oxygen, which simplified the aircraft's design.

Ammonia has been proposed as a practical alternative to fossil fuel for internal combustion engines. The calorific value of ammonia is 22.5 MJ/kg (9690 BTU/lb), which is about half that of diesel. In a normal engine, in which the water vapour is not condensed, the calorific value of ammonia will be about 21% less than this figure. It can be used in existing engines with only minor modifications to carburettors/injectors.

When ammonia is produced using coal, the CO_{2} emitted has the potential to be sequestered (the combustion products are nitrogen and water).

Ammonia engines or ammonia motors, using ammonia as a working fluid, have been proposed and occasionally used. The principle is similar to that used in a fireless locomotive, but with ammonia as the working fluid, instead of steam or compressed air. Ammonia engines were used experimentally in the 19th century by Goldsworthy Gurney in the UK and in streetcars in New Orleans. In 1981 a Canadian company converted a 1981 Chevrolet Impala to operate using ammonia as fuel.

Ammonia and GreenNH3 is being used with success by developers in Canada, since it can run in spark ignited or diesel engines with minor modifications, also the only green fuel to power jet engines, and despite its toxicity is reckoned to be no more dangerous than petrol or LPG. It can be made from renewable electricity, and having half the density of petrol or diesel can be readily carried in sufficient quantities in vehicles. On complete combustion it has no emissions other than nitrogen and water vapour. The combustion chemical formula is 4 NH_{3} + 3 O_{2} → 2 N_{2} + 6 H_{2}O, 75% water is the result.

=== Charcoal ===
In the 1930s Tang Zhongming made an invention using abundant charcoal resources for Chinese auto market. The charcoal-fuelled car was later used intensively in China, serving the army and conveyancer after the outbreak of World War II.

=== Liquefied natural gas ===
Liquefied natural gas (LNG) is natural gas that has been cooled to a point at which it becomes a cryogenic liquid. In this liquid state, natural gas is more than 2 times as dense as highly compressed CNG. LNG fuel systems function on any vehicle capable of burning natural gas. Unlike CNG, which is stored at high pressure (typically 3000 or 3600 psi) and then regulated to a lower pressure that the engine can accept, LNG is stored at low pressure (50 to 150 psi) and simply vaporized by a heat exchanger before entering the fuel metering devices to the engine. Because of its high energy density compared to CNG, it is very suitable for those interested in long ranges while running on natural gas.

In the United States, the LNG supply chain is the main thing that has held back this fuel source from growing rapidly. The LNG supply chain is very analogous to that of diesel or gasoline. First, pipeline natural gas is liquefied in large quantities, which is analogous to refining gasoline or diesel. Then, the LNG is transported via semi trailer to fuel stations where it is stored in bulk tanks until it is dispensed into a vehicle. CNG, on the other hand, requires expensive compression at each station to fill the high-pressure cylinder cascades.

=== Autogas ===
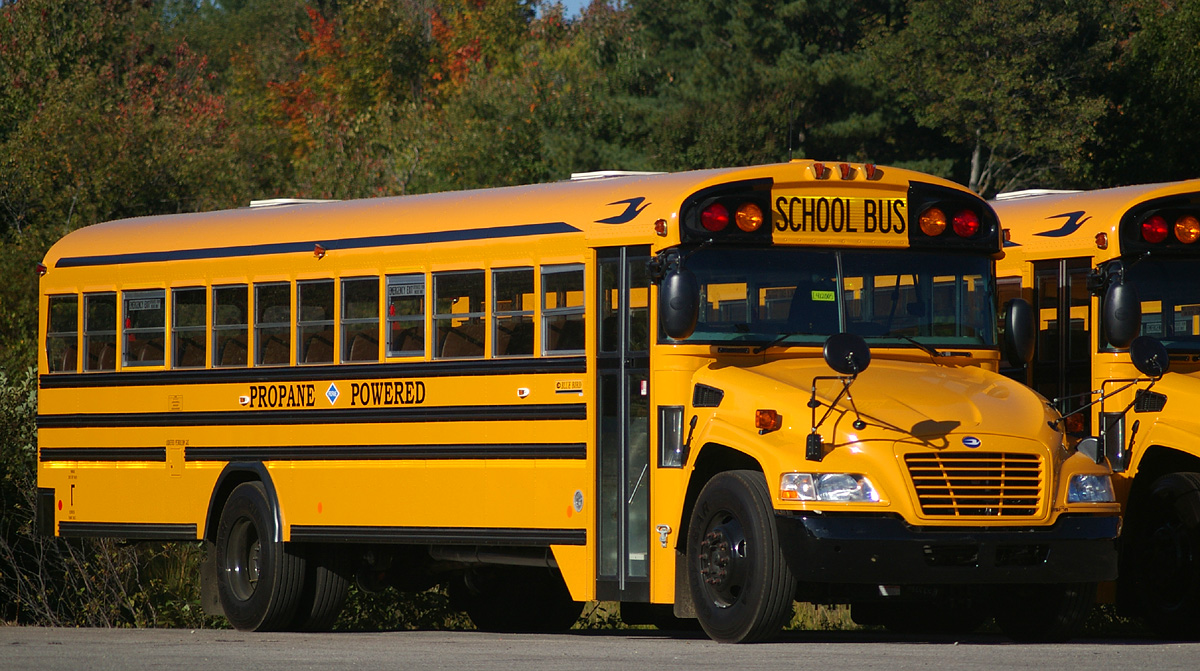
A propane-fueled school bus in the United States

LPG or liquefied petroleum gas (LPG) is a low pressure liquefied gas mixture composed mainly of propane and butane which burns in conventional gasoline combustion engines with less CO_{2} than gasoline. Gasoline cars can be retrofitted to LPG aka Autogas and become bifuel vehicles as the gasoline tank is not removed, allowing drivers to switch between LPG and gasoline during operation. Estimated 10 million vehicles running worldwide.

There are 24.9 million LPG powered vehicles worldwide as of December 2013, led by Turkey with 3.93 million, South Korea (2.4 million), and Poland (2.75 million). In the U.S., 190,000 on-road vehicles use propane, and 450,000 forklifts use it for power. However, it is banned in Pakistan (DEC 2013) as it is considered a risk to public safety by OGRA.

=== Formic acid ===
Formic acid is used by converting it first to hydrogen, and using that in a hydrogen fuel cell. It can also be used directly in formic acid fuel cells. Formic acid is much easier to store than hydrogen.

=== Liquid nitrogen car ===
Liquid nitrogen (LN2) is a method of storing energy. Energy is used to liquefy air, and then LN2 is produced by evaporation, and distributed. LN2 is exposed to ambient heat in the car and the resulting nitrogen gas can be used to power a piston or turbine engine. The maximum amount of energy that can be extracted from LN2 is 213 Watt-hours per kg (W·h/kg) or 173 W·h per liter, in which a maximum of 70 W·h/kg can be utilized with an isothermal expansion process. Such a vehicle with a 350-liter (93 gallon) tank can achieve ranges similar to a gasoline powered vehicle with a 50-liter (13 gallon) tank. Theoretical future engines, using cascading topping cycles, can improve this to around 110 W·h/kg with a quasi-isothermal expansion process. The advantages are zero harmful emissions and superior energy densities compared to a compressed-air vehicle as well as being able to refill the tank in a matter of minutes.

=== Nuclear power ===
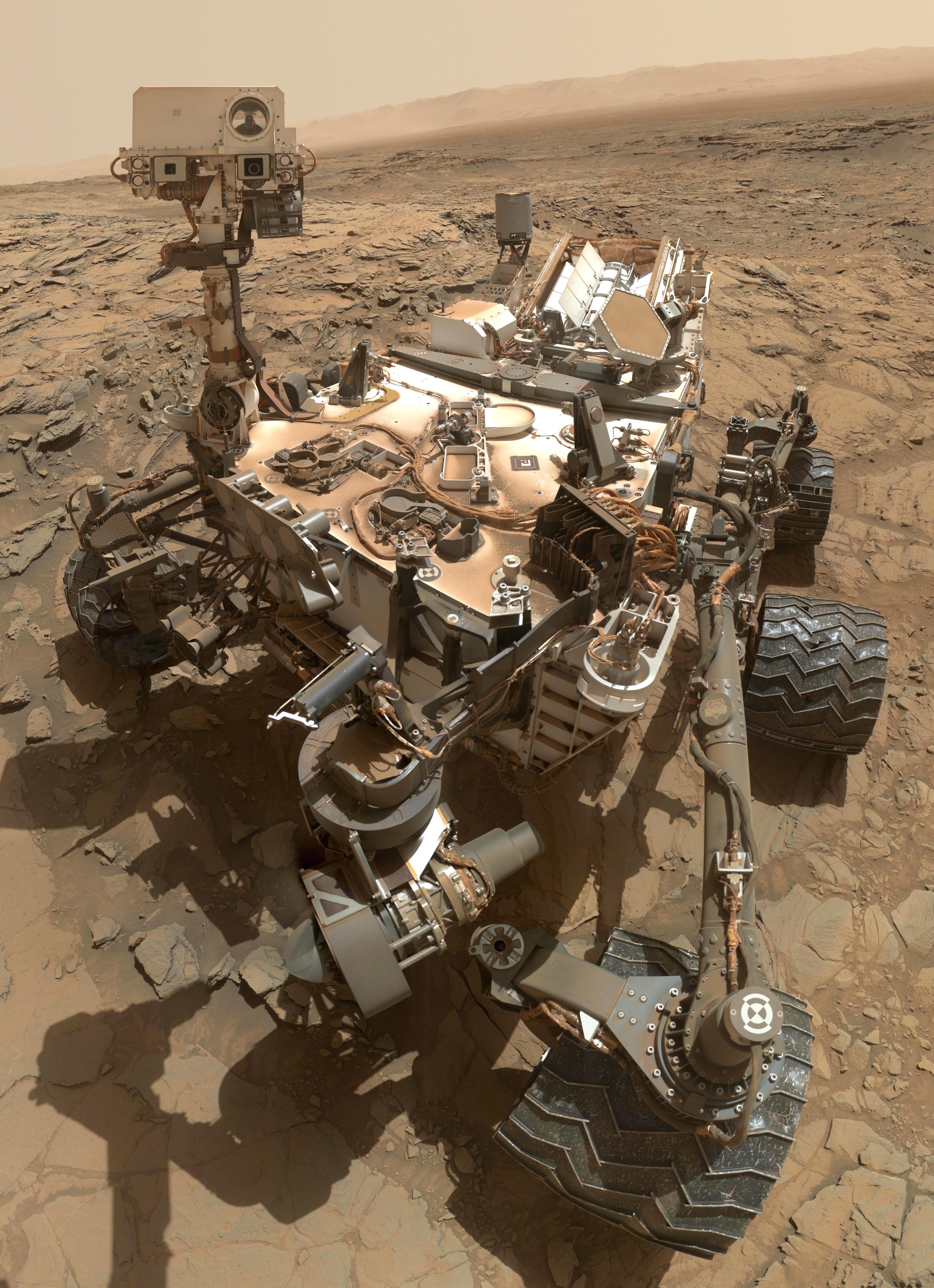
Mars rover Curiosity driven by radioisotope thermoelectric generators

In principle, it is possible to build a vehicle powered by nuclear fission or nuclear decay. However, there are two major problems: first one has to transform the energy, which comes as heat and radiation into energy usable for a drive. One possible would be to use a steam turbine as in a nuclear power plant, but such a device would take too much space. A more suitable way would be direct conversion into electricity for example with thermoelements or thermionic devices. The second problem is that nuclear fission produces high levels of neutron and gamma rays, which require excessive shielding, that would result in a vehicle too large for use on public roads. However studies were made in this way by Ford Nucleon.

A better way for a nuclear powered vehicle would be the use of power of radioactive decay in radioisotope thermoelectric generators, which are also very safe and reliable. The required shielding of these devices depends on the used radio nuclide. Plutonium-238 as nearly pure alpha radiator does not require much shielding. As prices for suitable radionuclide are high and energy density is low (generating 1 watt with plutonium-238 requires a half gram of it), this way of propulsion is too expensive for wide use. Also radioisotope thermoelectric generators offer according to their large content of high radioactive material an extreme danger in case of misuse for example by terrorists. The only vehicle in use, which is driven by radioisotope thermoelectric generators is the Mars rover Curiosity.

Other forms of nuclear power as fusion and annihilation are at present not available for vehicle propulsion, as no working fusion reactor is available and it is questionable if one can ever built one with a size suitable for a road vehicle. Annihilation may perhaps work in some ways (see antimatter drive), but there is no technology existing to produce and store enough antimatter.

=== Pedal-assisted electric hybrid vehicle ===
In very small vehicles, the power demand decreases, so human power can be employed to make a significant improvement in battery life. Three such commercially made vehicles are the Sinclair C5, ELF and TWIKE.

=== Flywheels ===
Flywheels can be also used for alternative fuel and were used in the 1950s for the propulsion of buses in Switzerland, the such called gyrobuses. The flywheel of the bus was loaded up by electric power at the terminals of the line and allowed it to travel a way up to 8 kilometres just with its flywheel. Flywheel-powered vehicles are quieter than vehicles with combustion engine, require no overhead wire and generate no exhausts, but the flywheel device has a great weight (1.5 tons for 5 kWh) and requires special safety measures due to its high rotational speed.

=== Silanes ===
Silanes higher than heptasilane can be stored like gasoline and may also work as fuel. They have the advantage that they can also burn with the nitrogen of the air, but have as major disadvantage its high price and that its combustion products are solid, which gives trouble in combustion engines.

=== Spring ===
The power of wound-up springs or twisted rubber cords can be used for the propulsion of small vehicles. However this way of energy storage allows only saving small energy amounts not suitable for the propulsion of vehicles for transporting people. Spring-powered vehicles are wind-up toys or mousetrap cars.

=== Steam ===
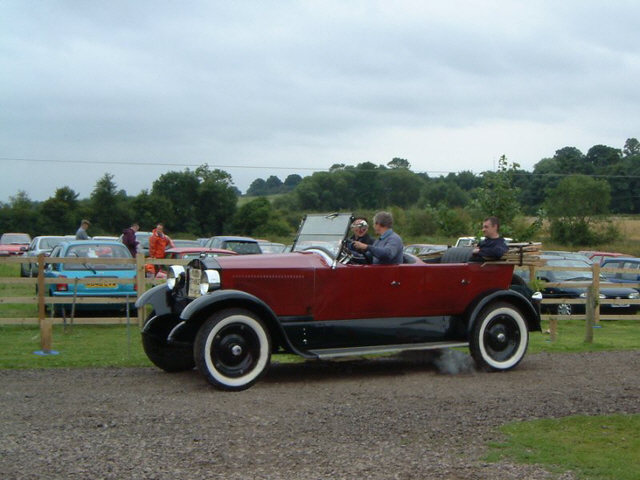
The Stanley Steamer car

A steam car is a car that has a steam engine. Wood, coal, ethanol, or others can be used as fuel. The fuel is burned in a boiler and the heat converts water into steam. When the water turns to steam, it expands. The expansion creates pressure. The pressure pushes the pistons back and forth. This turns the driveshaft to spin the wheels which provides moves the car forward. It works like a coal-fueled steam train, or steam boat. The steam car was the next logical step in independent transport.

Steam cars take a long time to start, but some can reach speeds over 100 mph (161 km/h) eventually. The late model Doble steam cars could be brought to operational condition in less than 30 seconds, had high top speeds and fast acceleration, but were expensive to buy.

A steam engine uses external combustion, as opposed to internal combustion. Gasoline-powered cars are more efficient at about 25–28% efficiency. In theory, a combined cycle steam engine in which the burning material is first used to drive a gas turbine can produce 50% to 60% efficiency. However, practical examples of steam engined cars work at only around 5–8% efficiency.

The best known and best selling steam-powered car was the Stanley Steamer. It used a compact fire-tube boiler under the hood to power a simple two-piston engine which was connected directly to the rear axle. Before Henry Ford introduced monthly payment financing with great success, cars were typically purchased outright. This is why the Stanley was kept simple; to keep the purchase price affordable.

Steam produced in refrigeration also can be use by a turbine in other vehicle types to produce electricity, that can be employed in electric motors or stored in a battery.

Steam power can be combined with a standard oil-based engine to create a hybrid. Water is injected into the cylinder after the fuel is burned, when the piston is still superheated, often at temperatures of 1500 degrees or more. The water will instantly be vaporized into steam, taking advantage of the heat that would otherwise be wasted.

=== Wind ===
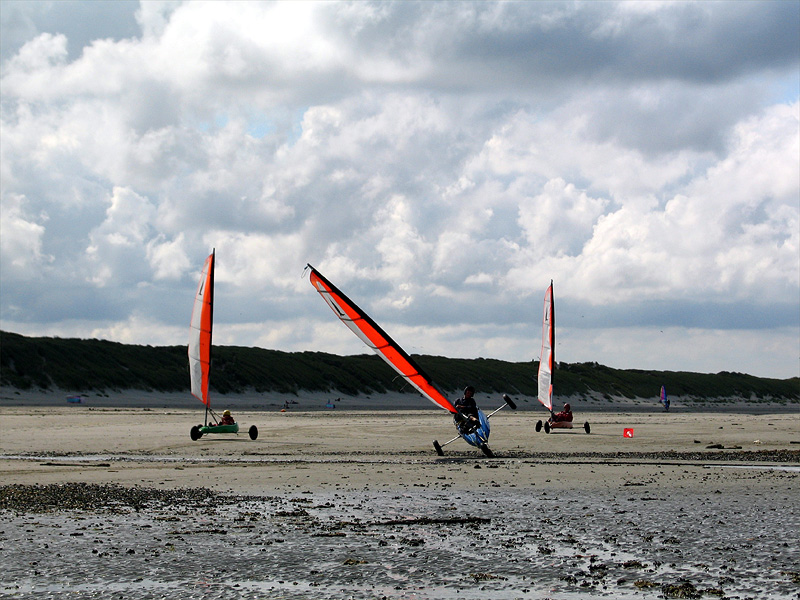
Wind powered vehicles for recreational purposes

Wind-powered vehicles have been well known for a long time. They can be realized with sails similar to those used on ships, by using an onboard wind turbine, which drives the wheels directly or which generates electricity for an electric motor, or can be pulled by a kite. Wind-powered land vehicles need an enormous clearance in height, especially when sails or kites are used and are unsuitable in urban area. They may be also be difficult to steer. Wind-powered vehicles are only used for recreational activities on beaches or other free areas.

=== Wood gas ===
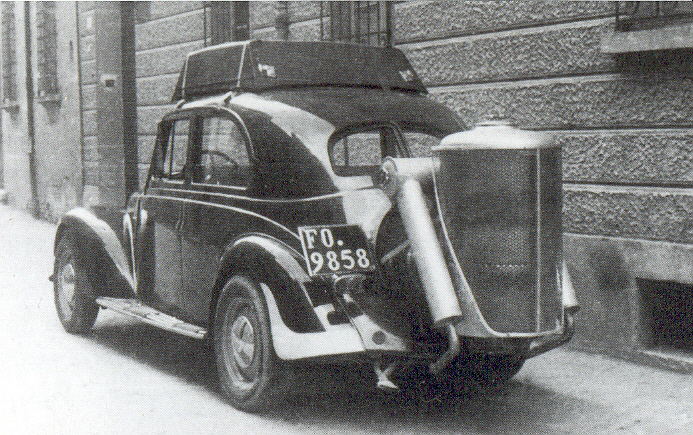
Vehicle with a gasifier

Wood gas can be used to power cars with ordinary internal combustion engines if a wood gasifier is attached. This was quite popular during World War II in several European and Asian countries because the war prevented easy and cost-effective access to oil.

As of 2014, Herb Hartman of Woodward, Iowa currently drives a wood powered Cadillac. He claims to have attached the gasifier to the Cadillac for just $700. Hartman claims, "A full hopper will go about fifty miles depending on how you drive it," and he added that splitting the wood was "labor-intensive. That's the big drawback."

== See also ==
- Alternative Fuels Training Consortium
- Alternatives to the automobile
- Bi-fuel vehicle
- Butanol fuel
- Carbon-neutral fuel
- Clean Cities
- Engine control unit altering to optimize running on different fuels
- Green vehicle
- Fuel gas-powered scooter
- Hydrogen vehicle
- The Hype about Hydrogen
- List of hybrid vehicles
- Phase-out of fossil fuel vehicles
- Renewable energy
- Solar vehicle
- Vehicle classification by propulsion system
- Water-fuelled car
- Wind-powered vehicle
