= Vehicle classification by propulsion system =

There are numerous versions of vehicle propulsion systems. Many of those came into fruition due to need for cleaner vehicles. Each of them might have many abbreviations and some might be misleading. This article explains shortly what defines them.

== Vehicle Classification by Propulsion System ==
- EV - Electric Vehicle - vehicle drives on electrical energy using at least one electric motor
- PEV - Plug-in Electric Vehicle - vehicle has a socket and can be propelled by electric power.
- BEV - Battery Electric Vehicle - vehicle drives on electrical energy stored in a battery.
- HEV - Hybrid Electric Vehicle - vehicle drives either with or without combustion engine. Does not a have socket for recharging battery.
- MHV - Mild hybrid Vehicle - vehicle drives with combustion engine. Energy recuperated is used for propulsion and auxiliary functions.
- Micro-Hybrid Vehicle - obsolete term. Recuperated energy is used for auxiliary functions like engine restart. These vehicles are classified as regular ICEV-s.
- PHEV - Plug in Hybrid Electric Vehicle - vehicle drives on stored electrical energy or with combustion engine depending on user preference.
- EREV - Extended Range Electric Vehicle - vehicle drives mostly on stored electrical energy. Range can be extended by onboard electric generator.
- ICEV - Internal Combustion Engine Vehicle - vehicle drives on internal combustion engine.
- FCEV - Fuel Cell Electric Vehicle - vehicle drives on electrical energy generated by hydrogen fuel cell. Does not a have socket for recharging battery.
- PFCV - Plug in Fuel Cell Vehicle - vehicle drives on stored electrical energy or electrical energy generated by Fuel Cell.
- Animal-Powered Vehicle - vehicle operates on animal power, usually animal is in front and pulling
- HPV - Human Powered Vehicle - vehicle operated solely on human power or stored power generated by human (KERS, battery, capacitor).
- HEHV - Human-Electric Hybrid Vehicle - vehicle drives on human power or electrical energy from any other source.
- SEV - Solar Electric Vehicle - vehicle largely drives on solar energy.
- CAV - Compressed Air Vehicle - vehicle drives on energy harvested from expansion of compressed air.
- Nuclear-Powered Vehicle - vehicle drives on energy generated by nuclear reaction.
- ECE Vehicle - External Combustion Engine Vehicle - vehicle drives on external combustion engine.

== EV - Electric vehicle ==
These vehicles are propelled by at least one electric motor. Good example is an electric locomotive that is drawing power directly from overhead wire or third rail. "Electric vehicle" is often cleverly interchanged with "Electrified vehicle" which doesn't specify what kind of powertrain vehicle actually has. Electric vehicles do not have secondary source for propulsion, such as internal combustion engine that is mechanically linked to wheels. This term doesn't specify whether vehicle relies on external power source or has it on board.

Examples: Electric locomotive, Trolleybus

== PEV - Plug-in Electric Vehicle ==
Alternative abbreviation: PIV (Plug-in Vehicle). Sometimes also called "Plug-in Electrified Vehicle". Widely spread vague terms for all vehicles that can be plugged in for recharging and move at least partially with electric propulsion

== BEV - Battery Electric Vehicle ==
Alternative abbreviations: EV (Electric Vehicle), AEV (All Electric Vehicle). These vehicles are propelled by at least one electric motor that gets the power from onboard battery. Energy can temporarily be held in a different device (flywheel, supercapacitor). It is generally accepted to drop the word "Battery" for all vehicles that clearly have it on board.

Examples: Electric car (Nissan Leaf, Tesla Model S), Electric Forklift, Segway, Battery Electric Bus, Electric scooter.

== HEV - Hybrid Electric Vehicle ==
Alternative abbreviation: FHEV (Full Hybrid Electric Vehicle). These vehicles are propelled by energy generated by internal combustion engine. Energy recuperated during deceleration or downhill driving is stored (usually in a battery - capacitor, flywheel & other methods are available) and used later for either engine assist, auxiliary functions or for propulsion without starting combustion engine for short distances. These vehicles do not have a socket therefore they cannot be recharged from the grid. All energy originates from combustion engine. HEV-s can be driven on electric power for short distances without running combustion engine.

Toyota made up a term "Self Charging Hybrid" which is very misleading. It is actually just a Hybrid Electric Vehicle. It can charge from running combustion engine though doing this will use more fuel than just driving using power from engine directly.

Examples: Toyota Prius Hybrid.

=== MHV - Mild Hybrid Vehicle ===
Alternative abbreviation: MHEV (Mild Hybrid Electric Vehicle), Subtype of HEV. These are similar to Hybrid Electric Vehicles but can't be driven without the help of internal combustion engine. MHEV powertrain is usually less complex compared to HEV. Often Combustion Engine is equipped with compact belt driven 48V starter-generator motor that replaces starter and generator and a 48V battery is added. Due to higher voltage, more energy can be recuperated when decelerating or going downhill. Electric motor can start the engine with vehicle in gear making take-off with stalled combustion engine smooth and instantaneous.

48V starter-generator can also be mounted differently and be uncoupled from combustion engine by transmission or clutch. This might allow 48V electric motor move the vehicle without starting combustion engine. In this case 48V equipped vehicle should be counted as Hybrid Electric Vehicle.

Examples: Hyundai Tucson 48V

=== Micro-Hybrid Vehicle ===
Confusing insufficiently distinguishable type of powertrain. Internal combustion Engine Vehicle (ICEV) with automatic Start&Stop function and smart alternator is often called Micro-Hybrid Vehicle. Often Start&Stop vehicle has beefier starter battery, rugged starter motor and maybe more powerful alternator though it is unspecified by how much. Micro Hybrid powertrain can not use stored power to help combustion engine move the vehicle because it doesn't have an electric motor that is engaged while vehicle is in motion. It has a starter. Like ICEV do. To avoid confusion it is not recommended to use a term that implies word "Hybrid" on a vehicle that doesn't have secondary source for propulsion. Micro-Hybrid Vehicles should be counted as regular ICEV with auto Start&Stop function.

== PHEV - Plug in Hybrid Electric Vehicle ==
These vehicles are propelled by two or more energy sources. One of them is electrical energy stored in a battery. The second one is combustion engine that either directly or indirectly turns the wheels. These vehicles can be used solely in electric mode and never run combustion engine. They can also run on fossil fuel and never be recharged though in this case they are no better than Hybrid Electric Vehicles. Usually electric range is significantly shorter than fossil fuel based range.

== EREV - Extended Range Electric Vehicle ==
Alternative abbreviations: RExEV (Range Extended Electric Vehicle), REEV (Range Extended Electric Vehicle), BEVx. Subtype of BEV. This vehicle is propelled by electric motor which is mostly powered by energy stored in a battery. If battery is depleted a secondary energy source, usually combustion engine driven electric generator, will kick in and provide power for electric motor to continue journey. Vehicle that will handle secondary energy source as the main one shall not be counted as Extended Range EV but rather regular PHEV. Manufacturer has to discourage careless and unjustified use of range extender. Vehicle has to be recharged from external source for next commute or be functionally noticeably limited in battery depleted mode: for example, limited performance, extended range shorter than electric range and limited top speed - these shall ensure significantly superior emission reductions compared to PHEVs over lifetime of the vehicle.

Widely sold series-production car that fits this classification is BMW i3 with Range Extender. This vehicle is unable to operate normally without recharging the battery after depletion. Range Extender is unable to generate enough power for normal acceleration and also heat up the cabin at the same time. Also generator is not going to last the lifetime of the vehicle as it was not designed to be used all the time. In US, fuel tank was artificially reduced in size to comply with CARB regulations. Vehicles like Chevrolet Volt have generators that can power electric powertrain with no limitations and therefore should be counted as Extended Range Electric Vehicles.

Examples: BMW i3 REx

== ICEV - Internal Combustion Engine Vehicle ==
These vehicles are propelled solely by internal combustion engine. Almost all vehicles have a starter motor that will crank the engine. Alternator is being fed by starter battery. That battery is recharged by alternator that is turned by engine. Electricity generated is used to recharge starter battery and also run all auxiliary functions like spark plugs, lights, fans. More advanced vehicles might be able to adjust alternator load according to circumstances. For example, allow alternator to run without load while accelerating (drawing all required auxiliary power from the battery) and charging starter battery at accelerated rate when slowing down and braking. This is unfoundedly called micro-hybrid powertrain likely as misleading marketing term. If any electric motor on board is able to apply torque to help the combustion engine that vehicle should be called Mild Hybrid Vehicle.

Examples: Regular car, motorcycle, truck

== FCEV - Fuel Cell Electric Vehicle ==
Alternative abbreviations: FCHV (Fuel Cell Hybrid Vehicle), FCV (Fuel Cell Vehicle), HFCV (Hydrogen Fuel Cell Vehicle), HFCEV (Hydrogen Fuel Cell Electric Vehicle). This type is actually electric vehicle that is powered by electric energy generated using onboard fuel cell. Fuel cell uses hydrogen stored in hydrogen tanks and oxygen from the air to create water and electricity. Water is discarded but electricity is used for propulsion. Similarly to Hybrid Electric Vehicle, there is a small traction battery. That battery is used to capture energy while slowing down, driving downhill and also energy created by fuel cell in advance. Fuel cells are not instantaneous - there is a significant delay between driver request for acceleration and electricity generation - fuel cell must be blasted with hydrogen gas and fresh air for it to generate electricity. That delay is prevented by keeping some energy readily available in a battery, capacitor or flywheel. These vehicles do not have a socket therefore they cannot be recharged from the grid. All energy originates from fuel cell.

Example: Toyota Mirai

== PFCV - Plug in Fuel Cell Vehicle ==
Alternative abbreviations: PFCEV (Plug in Fuel Cell Electric Vehicle), PFCHV (Plug in Fuel Cell Hybrid vehicle), PFCHEV (Plug in Fuel Cell Hybrid Electric vehicle), PHFCEV (Plug in Hybrid Fuel Cell Electric Vehicle). This vehicle is very similar to Fuel Cell Electric Vehicle but has a socket and can be recharged from the grid. Battery likely is significantly larger - comparable to Plug in Hybrid Electric Vehicle. This vehicle type can be used solely on electricity charged by plugging in or solely on electricity generated by fuel cell.

Example: Mercedes Benz GLC F-CELL

== Animal-Powered Vehicle ==
This vehicle is moved by an animal, usually a horse or donkey. Some vehicles were made mainly for people carrying and others mainly for goods. This was the main transportation method before the Industrial Revolution.

Example: Horse-drawn Vehicle

== HPV - Human-Powered Vehicle ==
This vehicle is powered by human - usually just one - the driver. There might be a buffering device like battery, capacitor of flywheel for kinetic energy recovery that can apply torque directly or with electric motor. But it can't be recharged without human effort.

Examples: bicycle, velotaxi (without socket for recharging)

== HEHV - Human–Electric Hybrid Vehicle ==
This vehicle is powered either by human or stored electrical energy. Most likely it has a socket or retractable cable with a plug for battery recharge. Battery can also be removed and charged separately. Vehicle might also have solar panels and might be able to recharge the battery without human effort. If solar installation is able to generate significant portion of energy that vehicle might be considered as Solar-Human Hybrid Vehicle.

Example: electric bicycle (must have pedals)

== SEV - Solar Electric Vehicle ==
Proposed abbreviation for vehicles that can recharge significant portion of their range with solar energy and do not have hybrid powertrain. The term "solar vehicle" usually implies that solar energy is used to power all or part of a vehicle's propulsion. Therefore, at least half of useful battery capacity (half of vehicle range) must be recharged without plugging in normal operation scenarios such as during a day.

Vehicles that have longer range therefore must capture more solar energy. Vehicles that are unable to charge more than half of their regular range with solar energy can still be called mildly solar powered if they can get at least some of the range from solar energy.

Examples: Solar plane, Mars rover.

== CAV - Compressed-Air Vehicle ==
Vehicle that is propelled by expansion of compressed atmospheric gas. If vehicle has a secondary energy source for propulsion it should be counted as CAHV - Compressed Air Hybrid Vehicle.

== Nuclear-Powered Vehicle ==
Vehicle with a nuclear reactor on board that generates energy for vehicle propulsion. Nuclear decay creates steady source of heat for years that can be used directly or converted into electricity. Often battery is added to meet peak demands of the vehicle.

Examples: Nuclear submarine, Voyager spacecraft, Perseverance (rover).

== ECE Vehicle - External Combustion Engine Vehicle ==
External Combustion Engine (EC Engine or ECE in short) is a historical engine type. This engine was powerful, but expensive to build. Steam locomotives and steam cars were External Combustion Engine driven Vehicles (or ECEV) are not used nowadays. They have been replaced by Internal Combustion Engine Vehicles (or ICEV).

Examples: Steam Locomotive, Steam Car

== See also ==
- Alternative fuel vehicle
- Bi-fuel vehicle
- Flexible-fuel vehicle
- Wind-powered vehicle
