= Alternative – die Grünen Zug =

- German name: Alternative – die Grünen Zug
- Founded: 27 August 2005
- Ideology: Green politics
- Political position: Left-wing politics

Website
- gruene-zug.ch

Die Alternative – die Grünen Zug (ALG) is a left-wing ecological party in the canton of Zug in Switzerland. It was formed in 2005 as Alternative Canton Zug through a merger of local groups. The largest of these groups was the Socialist Green Alternative Zug (SGA).

The SGA was founded in 1986 by members of the Socialist Workers' Party, non-party leftists and activists from the women's movement, trade unions and other initiatives.

From 1990 to 2006, Hanspeter Uster was a member of the Cantonal Government for the SGA . After the elections in October 2006, the Alternative Canton of Zug (ALG) was even represented in the Cantonal Government with two of the seven seats (Manuela Weichelt-Picard and Patrick Cotti). In October 2010, Patrick Cotti was voted out in favour of Stephan Schleiss (SVP). In the 2014 elections, the ALG increased its representation in the Cantonal Parliament from 7 to 10 seats. Councillor Weichelt was re-elected under the new majority voting system. In the 2018 cantonal elections, the ALG was unable to retain the seat of the retiring Manuela Weichelt-Picard, but the Alternative gained another seat in the Cantonal Parliament, giving them 11 members.

Between 2003 and 2011, the SGA (Swiss Alternative for Switzerland), or the Alternative – the Greens of Zug, held one of Zug's three seats in the Swiss National Council with Josef Lang. Lang joined the Green Party faction there from the outset. He narrowly missed re-election in the 2011 Swiss federal election. Since the 2019 elections, the Zug Alternatives (with Manuela Weichelt-Picard) have once again been represented in the National Council.

The Alternative Canton Zug was appointed a full member of the Green Party of Switzerland at the Green Party's delegates' meeting on 13 June 2009. Since then, the party has been called Alternative – the Greens Zug . On November 5, 2009, the Young Alternative Zug was founded as the youth wing of Alternative – the Greens Zug and as the Zug section of the Young Greens Switzerland.

The ALG advocates for fair tax and resource-conserving economic policies for the benefit of a strong society and economy with a healthy state budget, good public services, and protection of the landscape/environment.

== See also ==
- List of political parties in Switzerland
