= Tang Zhongming =

Chinese engineer and inventor (1897–1980)

Tang Zhongming (Chinese: 汤仲明; pinyin: Tāng Zhòngmíng; 1897–1980) was a Chinese engineer and inventor. Zhong-Ming Tang was born to a poor family in 1897. He attended elementary and middle school in Henan province graduating from Huaiqing Middle School at age 19, when he then attended Kaifeng Teachers Training Institute and the Beijing French School. From June 1919 to 1926 he studied in France.

Zhong-Ming Tang returned to China in 1926 during the time of the world oil crisis. In China (Kaifeng and Zhengzhou) he worked to develop a charcoal powered car to aid in China's energy efficiency and independence, which had been an issue during World War I. In 1931, he created an internal combustion engine powered by charcoal and mounted it in an automobile. In 1932 he founded Chung Ming Machinery Co., Ltd. in Shanghai, to produce commercially available charcoal fueled cars. During the Second Sino-Japanese War the charcoal car grew in popularity due to the high price of oil. His charcoal cars were popular until the early 1950s, when their popularity began to drop, especially in Southwest China where inexpensive fuel was easily accessible.
