= Alternative fuel locomotive =

Locomotive powered by alternative fuels

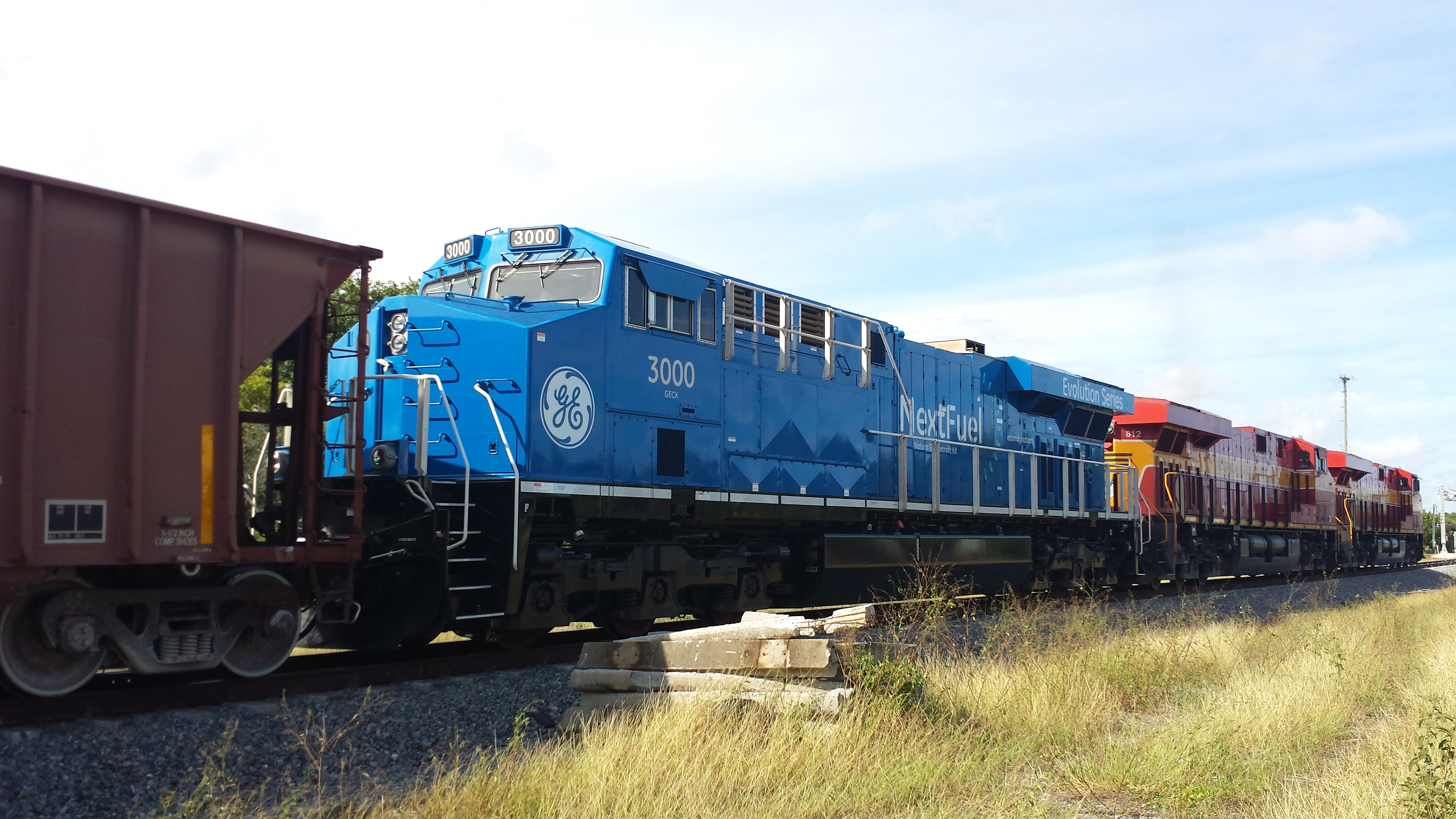
GE Evolution Series locomotive powered by natural gas in the United States

An alternative fuel locomotive refers to a locomotive that is not powered by oil or coal based fuels. In the 21st century, a variety of technologies are being experimentally tried as alternative fuels, including hydrogen, liquified natural gas, and compressed natural gas.

== Types ==
=== Hydrogen ===
In the United States, BNSF Railway tested a hydrogen powered switcher locomotive in 2008 and 2009, in partnership with the United States Army.

=== Battery electric ===
Several railroads have tested battery electric locomotives, which operate based on rechargeable batteries and have zero greenhouse gas emissions. Compared to conventional diesel locomotives, battery electric locomotives are quieter and cleaner, but require charging stations to support their use. At least one instance of a battery electric locomotive, for the Bessemer and Lake Erie Railroad, was funded by a state government grant supporting improvements to air quality. As of 2022, battery electric locomotives are only a small part of the locomotive fleet in North America, which numbers approximately 39,000.

== See also ==
- List of low-emissions locomotives
