= The Alternate =

- The Alternate, novel by John Martel (novelist)
- The Alternate (film)
- "The Alternate" (Star Trek: Deep Space Nine)
