= Compressed-air car =

Vehicle that uses a motor powered by stored compressed air

A compressed-air car is a compressed-air vehicle powered by pressure vessels filled with compressed air. It is propelled by the release and expansion of the air within a motor adapted to compressed air. The car might be powered solely by air, or combined (as in a hybrid electric vehicle) with other fuels such as gasoline, diesel, or an electric plant with regenerative braking.

Compressed-air cars use a thermodynamic process. Air cools when expanding and heats when compressed. Thermal energy losses in the compressor and tankage reduce the capacity factor of compressed air systems.

== Technology ==
=== Engines for compressed air ===
Dipietro eccentric shaft with a rotary vane air engine

There have been several dubious claims with undisclosed information. The "di pietro" engine has been tested partially with CAD and finite element analysis programs. The results were published by Jarosław Zwierzchowski from Lodz University of Technology in 2017. This motor is an eccentric shaft vane motor that uses low air pressure.

=== Compressed air tanks and collision safety ===
The tanks must be designed to safety standards for a pressure vessel. ISO 11439 is a similar standard, for compressed natural gas tanks.

The air storage tanks usable in compressed air cars can be low pressure (9 atm) or high pressure (240+ atm). Thus, they can be made of composite materials like thermoplastics and fiber reinforced thermoplastics, This might permit low priced tankage. It might be made by rotational molding. Such tanks can be much lighter than lithium-iron batteries and 70% lighter than steel tanks. They resist rust from air, water and condensation. They last longer with less maintenance.

To reduce car weight further the pressure vessels can be used as structural parts of the chassis. Advanced 700-atmosphere pressure vessels have been developed for hydrogen cars. Crash tests showed good safety. Fiber reinforced thermoplastic tanks only rupture in collisions. They do not shatter or explode.

Hydrogen tanks require ‘high strength’ to prevent rupture and ‘high stiffness’ for durability. Strength resists an external force. Stiffness maintains a shape. Carbon fiber hydrogen fuel tanks are as light as plastic but six times the strength of steel and four times the stiffness. “When a bullet penetrates a hydrogen tank, it does not explode. Instead, hydrogen leaks out through the bullet hole. In a standard collision test, not even a tiny amount of hydrogen was detected because none had leaked out."

=== Compressed air production and storage ===
Compressed air can also be produced by attaching an air compressor or hydraulic pump to a wind turbine or by using a river, tidal or wave hydropower turbine. These all convert directly from mechanical to pneumatic energy. Eliminating electricity from the cycle gives higher efficiency overall. It is also possible to use thermal solar energy with a parabolic or Fresnel lens solar concentrator to power a thermal Stirling engine. This can move the compressor or pump. Solar Stirling is more efficient than solar steam or photovoltaic.

== Emissions ==
Compressed air cars are emission free. They also do not require a connection to the electric grid. A wind turbine or other renewable energy source can directly drive an air compressor or hydraulic pump. Compressed air cars do not rely on petrol stations or an electric grid. While centralized infrastructure might not be needed, it is an option. Tankage can be directly shipped, or a pipeline can be utilized.Compressed air is normally filtered to protect the compressor machinery. Therefore, discharge air has very little suspended dust. There may be some lubricants emitted by some systems, but further development might reduce this with oil free compressors and intercoolers

== Resource consumption ==
Composite pressure vessels and pneumatic components could permit compressed air cars to be a circular industry. The materials would have to be biobased or recycled. Electric energy is not used, so there is no need for metals like copper, iron in magnets, etc.

== Advantages ==
There can be a single conversion of mechanical energy to pneumatic or hydraulic energy. Therefore, compressed air can have high energy efficiency when using mechanical renewable energy such as wind turbines or hydropower. Thermal energy to mechanical energy conversion is possible, but less efficient due to Carnot conversion inefficiencies. Thermal storage of heat from a renewable solar source is also possible using a phase change material such as a molten salt.

Energy efficiency of the 2020 isothermal prototype vehicle was 59.4% of a lithium-ion vehicle.

Compressed air technology adapts to renewable energy and possibly a circular economy, if biobased or recycled composites can be used. Thus it is more sustainable than electric cars. For example, there is much less use of metals, or toxic battery chemistries. A centralized manufacturing and electric grid might be less necessary.

Efficiency is also helped by the low weight of composite pressure vessels relative to steel tanks or lithium-ion batteries. Weight might be further reduced if the tanks support the car chassis. Pneumatic engines also have lower weights than electric engines.

Refueling is possible in many places using only wind, solar power or hydropower to move an air compressor, hydraulic pump or Stirling engine.

Pneumatic power has energy synergy, because it is well suited to automotive mechatronics. Many car systems can be powered by small air motors. For example, active pneumatic suspension, pneumatic steering, or pneumatic shock absorbers. Expansion of the compressed air creates cold temperatures, and can directly provide air conditioning or climate control.

Energy recovery systems with regenerative suspension and regenerative braking produce low pressure compressed air. This can be stored in a pressure vessel.

Pistonless engines using compressed air are very quiet.

There is no fire hazard after accidents, unlike systems that utilize combustion fuels or high power batteries.

Compressed air engines reduce the cost of car production, because there is no need to build a cooling system, spark plugs, starter motor, or mufflers.

The rate of self-discharge is very low compared to batteries. A fueled, compressed-air vehicle may be left unused for a longer time than an electric car.

They reduce or eliminate hazardous chemicals such as gasoline, battery acids and related metals such as lead.

Compressed air cars are safer in more situations:

- potentially explosive work atmospheres
- brush-fire areas
- the vicinity of strong magnetic electric fields
- radio quiet zones

== Disadvantages ==
Compressed air has a lower energy density than liquid nitrogen or hydrogen.

While batteries somewhat maintain their voltage throughout their discharge and chemical fuel tanks provide the same power densities from the first to the last litre, the pressure of compressed air tanks falls as air is drawn off. There are mechanical methods (e.g. continuously variable transmissions or auxiliary motors) to reduce this effect, but they add expense.

== Developers and manufacturers ==
Various companies are investing in the research, development and deployment of compressed air cars. The MDI Air Car made its public South African debut in 2002. It was predicted to be in production "within six months" in January 2004. As of 2022, it was not in production.

=== MDI ===
MDI has proposed a range of vehicles made up of AIRPod, OneFlowAir, CityFlowAir, MiniFlowAir and MultiFlowAir. One of the main innovations of this company is its implementation of its "active chamber", which is a compartment which heats the air (through the use of a fuel) in order to double the energy output. This 'innovation' was first used in torpedoes in 1904.

=== Tata Motors ===
As of January 2009, Tata Motors of India had planned to launch a car with an MDI compressed air engine in 2011. In December 2009 Tata's vice president of engineering systems confirmed that the limited range and low engine temperatures were causing problems.

Tata Motors announced in May 2012 that they have assessed the design past phase 1, the "proof of the technical concept", and were proceeding to full production for the Indian market. Tata moved to phase 2, "completing detailed development of the compressed air engine into specific vehicle and stationary applications".

In February 2017, Dr. Tim Leverton, president and head at Advanced and Product Engineering at Tata revealed that the project was "starting industrialisation" with the first vehicles to be available by 2020. Other reports indicate Tata is also reviving plans for a compressed air version of the Tata Nano, This had previously been under consideration as part of their collaboration with MDI.

=== Engineair Pty Ltd ===
Engineair is an Australian company. It produced prototypes of small vehicles using a rotary air engine designed by Angelo Di Pietro. The company is seeking commercial partners to utilise its engine.

=== Peugeot/Citroën ===
In 2013, Peugeot and Citroën announced that they intended to build a hybrid car using compressed air as an energy source. A gasoline engine propels the car more than 70 km/h or when the compressed air tank has been depleted.

The head of the project left Peugeot in 2014. In January 2015, PSA Peugeot Citroën indefinitely delayed the development of its seemingly promising Hybrid Air powertrain, apparently unable to find a development partner willing to share the huge costs of engineering the system, estimated at 500 million Euros. Production volumes would have to be more than 500,000 cars a year to repay these costs.

=== APUQ ===
APUQ (Association de Promotion des Usages de la Quasiturbine) has made the APUQ Air Car, a car powered by a Quasiturbine.

=== Evrin ===
In 2020, Dr. Reza Alizade Evrin of Ontario Tech University developed an isothermal compressed air vehicle. This prototype used low pressure air tanks and exhaust air recovery to power a paraffin heat exchanger system. Its energy efficiency reached 74%. This is as much as 90% of the efficiency of lithium-ion electric cars. It had a driving range of 140 km (86 mi.). Efficiency and range might be increased by a number of practical improvements. For example, combining the storage tank into the car chassis, higher pressure tanks, new rotary engines, and a more efficient heat exchanger. Also, the weight and cost of tanks and pneumatic parts might be reduced by using recycled and bio-based thermoplastics.

== See also ==
- Air engine
- Charging station
- Compressed air energy storage
- Compressed air battery
- Compressed air vehicles
- Engine swap
- Plug-in hybrid
- Pneumatics
