= Compressed-air vehicle =

Car that uses pneumatic motors

A compressed-air vehicle (CAV) is a transport mechanism fueled by tanks of pressurized atmospheric gas and propelled by the release and expansion of the gas within a pneumatic motor.

CAVs have found application in torpedoes, locomotives used in situations where standard locomotives are a hazard, and early prototype submarines.

Compressed-air vehicles operate according to a thermodynamic process in which air cools down when expanding and heats up when being compressed, resulting in unwanted energy losses. However, with recent developments in isothermal compressed air energy storage (ICAES) plants, compressed air storage has reached 3.6 MJ/m^{3} and four times the capacity factor of lithium-ion batteries with 2.7 MJ/kg. In 2020 there were developments published by Dr. Reza Alizade Evrin from Ontario Tech University with an isothermal compressed-air vehicle prototype that uses low-pressure air tanks and exhaust air recovery to power a paraffin heat exchanger system with a global energy efficiency of 74% and a driving range of 140 km (87 mi). This efficiency and range can be increased by using storage tanks as vehicle structure, high-pressure tanks, new rotary engines, and a more efficient heat exchanger.

Compressed-air propulsion may also be incorporated in hybrid systems, such as with battery electric propulsion. This kind of system is hybrid pneumatic–electric propulsion. Regenerative braking can also be used in such systems.

== Compressed-air engines ==
In principle, any pneumatic motor can be used for a compressed-air vehicle, but some engines were specifically developed for this application and/or have specific advantages.

=== Di Pietro engine ===
Dipietro eccentric shaft, rotary vane air engine

There have been several dubious claims with undisclosed information. However, the "Di Pietro" engine has been partially tested with CAD and finite element analysis program and published in scientific papers by Jarosław Zwierzchowski from Lodz University of Technology in 2017, which is an eccentric shaft vane motor that uses low air pressure.

=== Liquidpiston ===
Another recent engine that could be adapted to compressed air is the Liquidpiston rotary engine.

== Compressed-air tanks and collision safety ==
The tanks must be designed to safety standards appropriate for a pressure vessel, such as ISO 11439.

The pressure vessels or air storage tanks that can be used in compressed-air vehicles can be made for low pressure (9 atm (130 psi)) or high (more than 240 atm (3,500 psi)), and can be made of composite materials like thermoplastic and fiber-reinforced thermoplastics, that means that the price can drop by using recycled or biobased thermoplastics using rotational molding and they are much lighter than lithium-ion batteries and 70% lighter compared to steel tanks, also they have more lifespan and don't need much maintenance.

To reduce vehicle weight further the air tanks can be used as structural storage so the tank is the main part of the vehicle chassis while using appropriate impact isolation, however fiber reinforced thermoplastic tanks only have ruptures in case of collision and don't explode. Some advances in pressure vessels for vehicles have been developed for hydrogen vehicles with high compression pressure vessels. Automobile designer Hyundai states:

Hydrogen tanks require ‘High Strength’ to prevent rupture and ‘High Stiffness’ for durability. Strength is defined as the level of resistance to an influence of an external force. Stiffness is the level of resistance maintaining its original shape. The carbon fiber materials used in making hydrogen fuel tanks is as light as a plastic but has six and four times the strength and stiffness of steel, respectively. “When a bullet penetrates a hydrogen tank, it does not explode. Instead, hydrogen leaks out through the bullet hole. In a standard collision test, not even a tiny amount of hydrogen was detected because none had leaked out.

== Compressed-air production, storage and energy efficiency and density ==
Compressed air has a low energy density, however near-isothermal compressed air storage ICAES can reach 3.6 MJ/m^{3} and has almost four times the energy density of lithium-ion batteries with 2.7 MJ/kg.

Compressed air can be produced by attaching an air compressor or hydraulic pump to a wind turbine or by using a river, tidal, or wave hydropower turbine with only a conversion from mechanical to pneumatic energy, eliminating electricity from the loop, which gives higher efficiency overall.

Additionally, there is the possibility of using thermal energy with a parabolic or Fresnel lens solar concentrator to power a thermal Stirling engine to move the compressor or pump, as solar-powered Stirling engines are more efficient than solar steam and photovoltaic.

== Emissions ==
Since the compressed air is filtered to protect the compressor machinery, the air discharged has less suspended dust in it, though there may be carry-over of lubricants used in the compressor or engine. This can be mitigated by using oil-free air compressors.

== Resource consumption ==
The recent developments of composite pressure vessels and pneumatic components mean that compressed-air vehicles can be part of the circular industry with biobased or recycled components. Also, by cutting electric energy from the loop there is no need for an electric grid and the metals used like copper, iron in magnets, etc.

== History ==
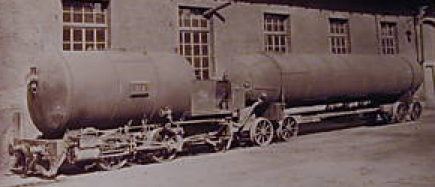
Gotthardbahn – pneumatic locomotive with attached pressure container

Compressed air has been used since the 19th century to power mine locomotives and trams in cities such as Paris (via a central, city-level, compressed air energy distribution system), and was previously the basis of naval torpedo propulsion.

During the construction of the Gotthardbahn from 1872 to 1882, pneumatic locomotives were used in the construction of the Gotthard Rail Tunnel and other tunnels of the Gotthardbahn.

In 1903, the Liquid Air Company located in London, United Kingdom, manufactured several compressed-air and liquified-air cars. The major problem with these cars and all compressed-air cars is the lack of torque produced by the "engines" and the cost of compressing the air.

Since 2010, several companies have started to develop compressed air cars, including hybrid types that also include a petrol-driven engine; none has been released to the public, or have been tested by third parties.

== Advantages ==
With the efficiency of using wind turbines to power compressors or pumps, there is a single conversion of mechanical to pneumatic or hydraulic energy. Also, by powering the compressor with a Stirling engine using a parabolic or Fresnel lens solar concentrator, there is thermal to mechanical energy conversion. Lastly, by using a phase change material in the heat exchanger heated with concentrated solar power there is only solar thermal energy involved.

The most efficient compressed-air vehicle as of 2020 is an isothermal prototype at 74%, which is similar to the 73-90% of electric vehicles using lithium-ion batteries.

Compared to lithium-ion, isothermal compressed air energy storage (ICAES) can be at least 2.7 MJ/kg or 3.6 MJ/m^{3}, 4 times of lithium-ion batteries, which can be improved with high-pressure vessels and heat exchanger systems.

Resources, compressed air technology can be adapted to renewable energy and circular industry with biobased or recycled composites and so compared to electric vehicles they can be exempt from finite mineral resources or toxic processes used in battery and electric motor manufacturing and also from the electric grid use. Refilling is possible in almost any place or with onboard equipment. It may take advantage of other renewable sources such as wind, solar power or river, tidal, wave hydropower to move an air compressor, hydraulic pump or Stirling engine.

The structural weight of composite pressure vessels is low relative to lithium-ion batteries and also to steel tanks (70% lighter), which can be reduced by using the tanks as vehicle chassis structures with appropriate impact isolation. The wheel hub motor rotary engines are also lightweight.

They have energy synergy with the available pneumatic energy, so all vehicle mechatronics systems can be powered by small air motors, and the vehicle can also use active pneumatic suspension, pneumatic steering, or pneumatic shock absorption bumpers, and provide air conditioning or climate control using the low temperature created during air expansion. Energy recovery systems with regenerative suspension and regenerative braking produce low pressure compressed air to be stored in an additional pressure vessel.

There is little noise from pistonless rotary engines while using compressed air, which can also be soundproofed because the low temperature in which it works.

There is no fire hazard, which makes it one of the few transportation systems that cannot produce spontaneous or after-collision fire or explosions as with petrol, ethanol, hydrogen and also battery vehicles.

== Disadvantages ==
The energy density of compressed air is low compared to liquid nitrogen or hydrogen, and the energy efficiency of compressed air engine compared to a micro gas turbine with adequate soundproofing that can be used in hybrid gas turbine-electric motor vehicles with a mixture of compressed air, liquid nitrogen or hydrogen (previous gas turbine vehicles have used a setup for speed, rather than efficiency consisting in a large noise gas turbines connected to the transmission) since gas turbines (which are used in thermal power plants due to its efficiency) outperforms pistonless rotary engines. However, the production of compressed air is more energy efficient and so requires less wind power and infrastructure and also there is a loss of efficiency from gas turbine to generator and to electric motor.

While batteries can somewhat maintain their voltage throughout their discharge, and chemical fuel tanks provide the same power densities from the first to the last litre, the pressure of compressed air tanks falls as air is drawn off, reducing the available power.

== Possible improvements ==
It may be possible to store compressed air at lower pressure using an absorption material within the tank. Absorption materials like Activated carbon, or a metal organic framework are used for storing compressed natural gas at 500 psi (34 atm) instead of 4,500 psi (310 atm), which amounts to a large energy saving.

== Vehicles ==
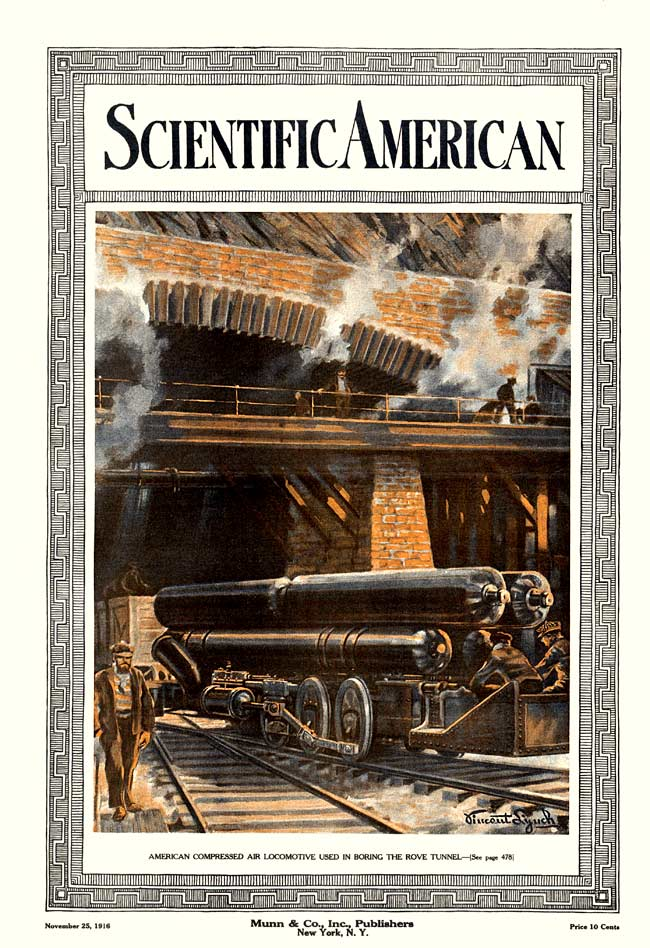
Compressed-air locomotive used in boring the Rove canal tunnel in France

=== Production cars ===
Several companies had investigated or produced prototypes including hybrid compressed-air/gasoline-combustion vehicles. By August 2017, none of the developers had yet gone into production, although Tata had indicated they would begin selling vehicles from 2020 and MDI's US distributor Zero Pollution Motors said production of the AIRPod would commence in Europe in 2018. As of 2024, neither developer has begun production.

=== Experimental cars and bikes ===
In 2008, a compressed air and natural gas powered vehicle designed by engineering students at Deakin University in Australia was the joint winner of the Ford Motor Company T2 competition to produce a car with a 200 km (120 mi) range and an estimated cost of less than $7,000.

Australian company Engineair has produced several vehicle types - moped, small car, small carrier, go-cart - around the rotary compressed air engine created by Angelo Di Pietro.

A compressed-air powered motorcycle, called the Green Speed Air Powered Motorcycle was made by Edwin Yi Yuan, based on the Suzuki GP100 and using the Angelo Di Pietro compressed-air engine.

Three mechanical engineering students from San Jose State University; Daniel Mekis, Dennis Schaaf and Andrew Merovich, designed and built a bike that runs on compressed air. The total cost of the prototype was under $1000 and was sponsored by Sunshops (on the Boardwalk in Santa Cruz, California) and NO DIG NO RIDE (from Aptos, California). The top speed of the maiden voyage in May 2009 was 23 mph (37 km/h). While their design was simple, these three pioneers of compressed air powered vehicles helped pave the way for French automaker Peugeot Citroën to invent a brand new air-powered hybrid. The 'Hybrid Air' system uses compressed air to move the car's wheels when driving under 43 mph (69 km/h). Peugeot said the new hybrid system should get up to 141 miles per gallon of gas. Models were claimed to start rolling out as early as 2016. However, the head of the project left Peugeot in 2014, and in 2015 the company said it had been unable to find a partner to share the development costs, effectively ending the project.

"Ku:Rin" named air-compressed three-wheeler vehicle was created by Toyota in 2011. The specialty of this vehicle is it has registered a record-breaking highest speed of 129.2 km/h (80.3 mph) even if it has an engine that uses only compressed air. This car was developed by the company's "Dream car workshop". This car is nicknamed as "sleek rocket", or "pencil shaped rocket".

As part of the TV-show Planet Mechanics, Jem Stansfield and Dick Strawbridge converted a regular scooter to a compressed air moped. This has been done by equipping the scooter with a compressed-air engine and air tank.

In 2010, Honda presented the Honda Air concept car at the LA Auto Show.

Since 2008 the former Bosch Rexroth, now Emerson is organizing the Emerson's International AVENTICS Pneumobile Competition in Eger, Hungary. It is a competition for students in the higher education to build racing vehicles propelled by compressed air.

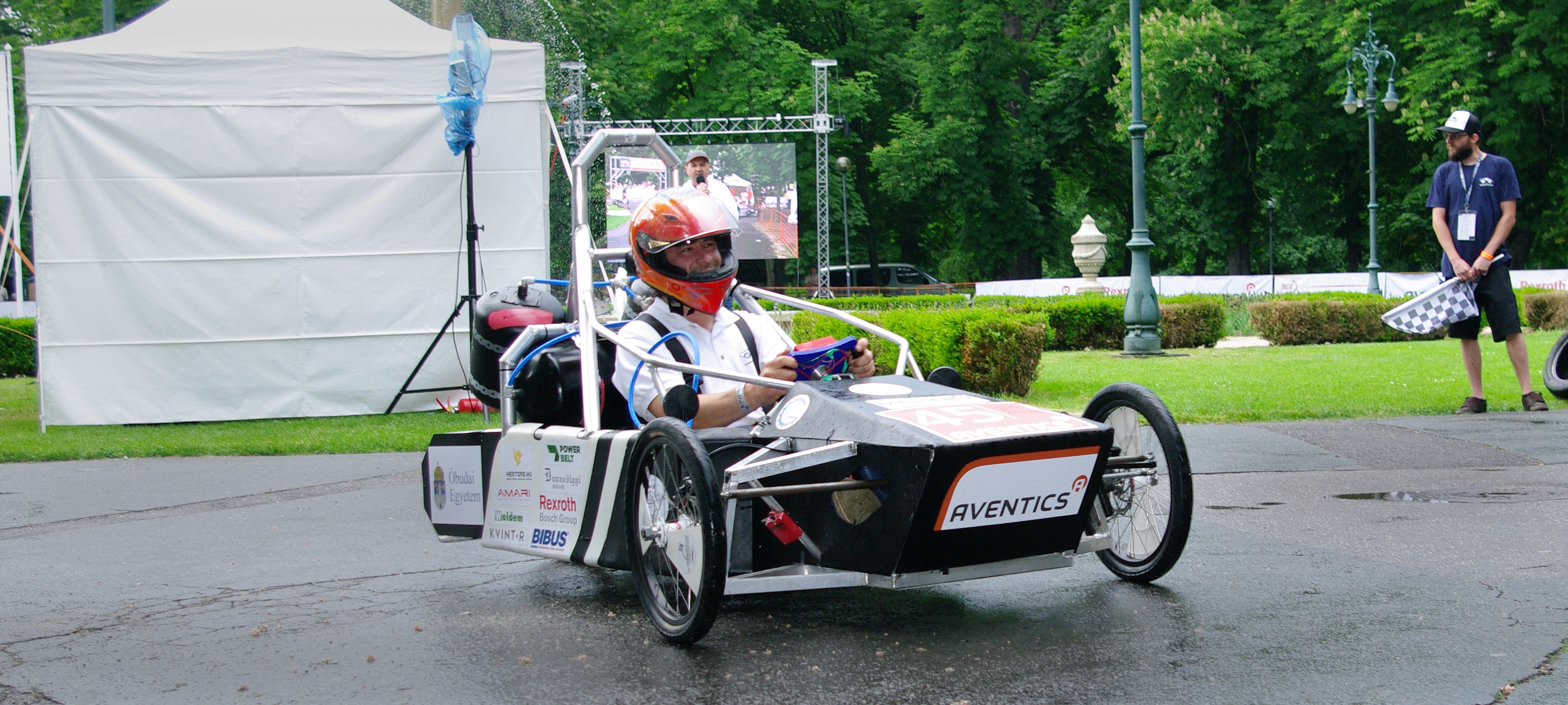
Óbuda University PowAir Pneumobil Team

There is an international conference related to the event organized by Óbuda University, Department of Bánki Donát Mechanical and Safety Engineering.

=== Trains, Trams, Boats and Planes ===
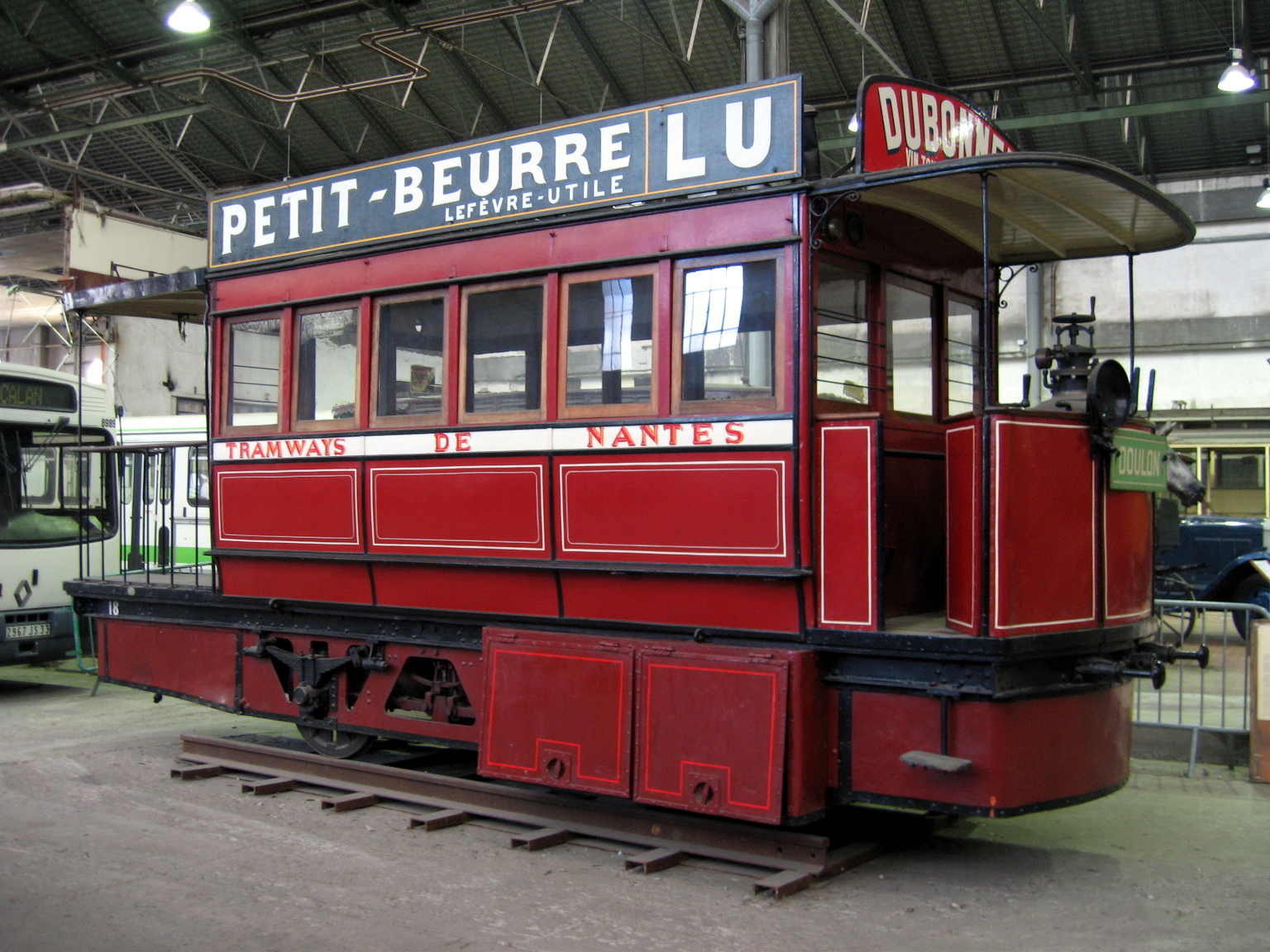
Preserved Nantes compressed-air tramcar at the AMTUIR museum

Compressed-air locomotives are a kind of fireless locomotive and have been used in mining and tunnel boring.

Various compressed-air-powered trams were trialled, starting in 1876. In Nantes and Paris Mekarski system trams ran in regular service for over 30 years. See also Nantes tramway#Compressed-air trams (1879–1917).

Currently, no water or air vehicles exist that make use of the compressed-air engine. Historically certain torpedoes were propelled by compressed-air engines.

== See also ==
- Air engine
- Alternative fuel
- Alternative propulsion
- Charging station
- Compressed-air energy storage
- Compression ratio
- Global warming
- Liquid nitrogen vehicle
- Pistonless rotary engine
- Plug-in hybrid
- Pneumatics
