= Pneumatic gripper =

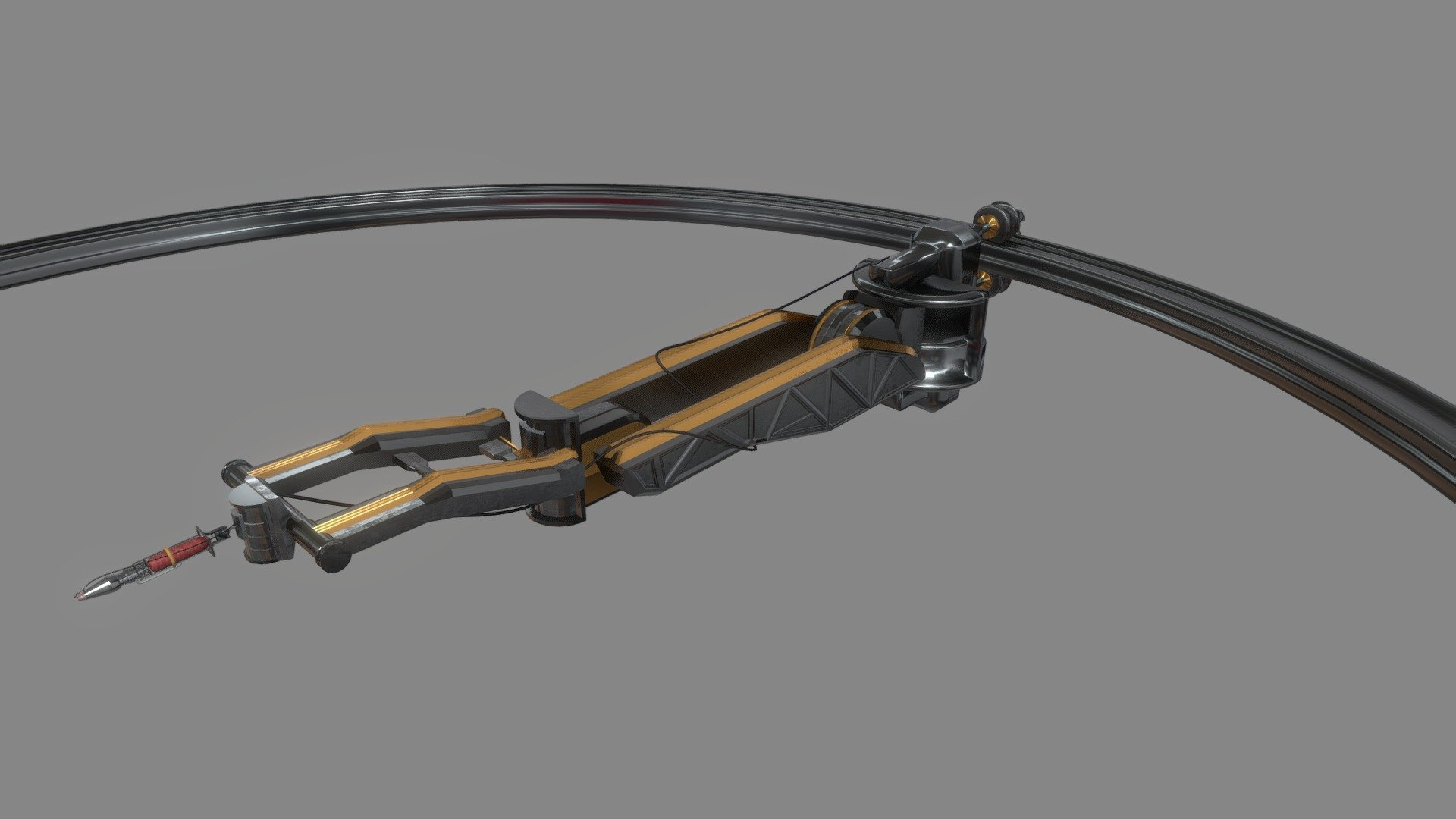
A 3D model of a Pneumatic gripper arm

A pneumatic gripper is a specific type of pneumatic actuator that typically involves either parallel or angular motion of surfaces, A.K.A. “tooling jaws or fingers” that will grip an object. The gripper makes use of compressed air which powers a piston rod inside the tool.Grippers exist both internal with and external bore grip with the same equipment because of an increased quantity of cross rollers in the parallel slide part.
