= Tank station =

Tank station may refer to:

- Filling station
- Compressed air energy storage
