= Air turbine =

An air turbine is a turbine driven by airflow. Various forms include:

- Wind turbine, a renewable energy source
- Gas turbine, a type of internal combustion engine
- Ram air turbine (RAT), an emergency power system for aircraft
- Small air turbines, used as high-speed pneumatic motors in tools such as dentist's drills
