= AIRPod =

In-development compressed-air vehicle

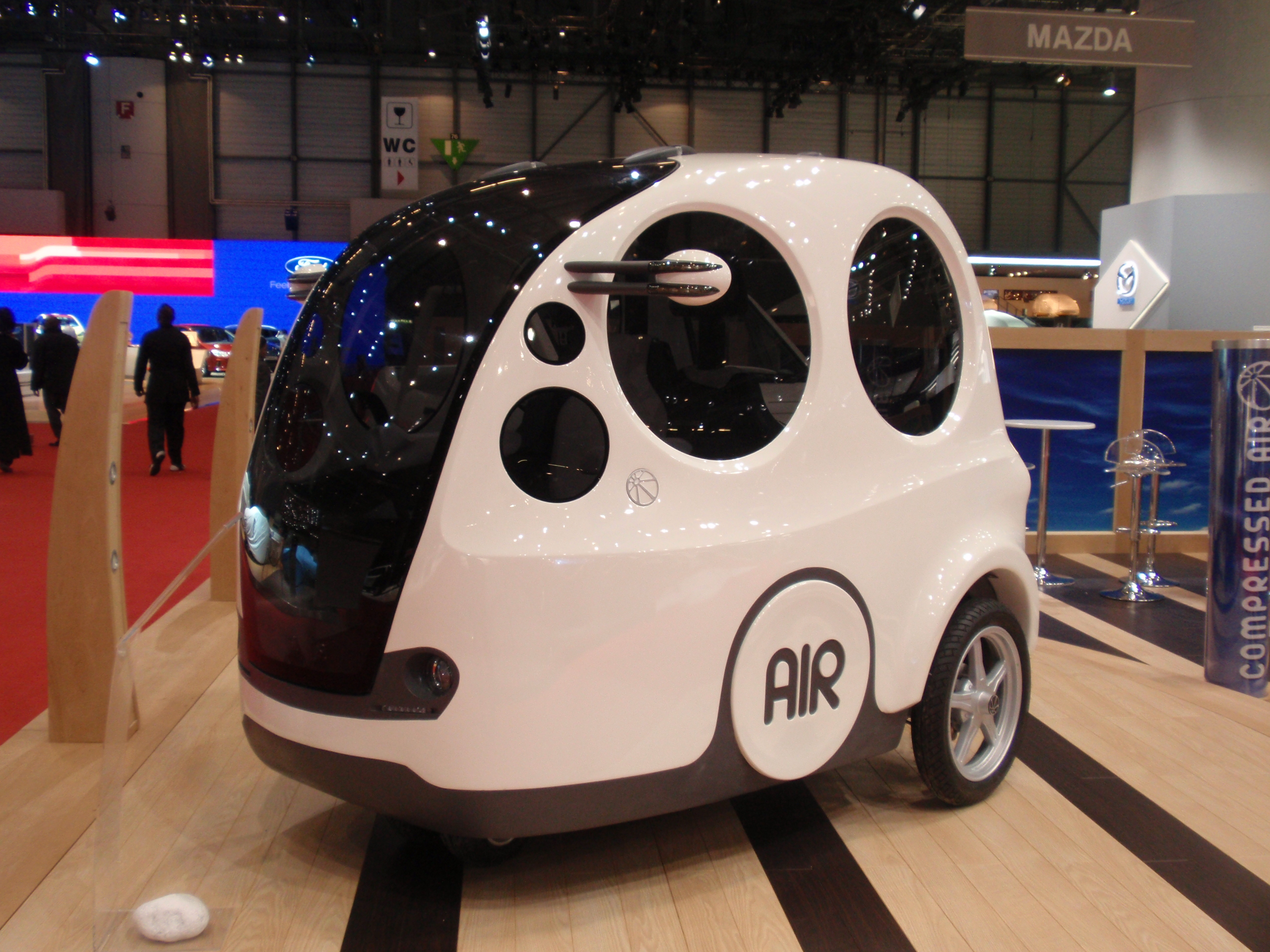
- MDI AIRPod at the 2009 Geneva Motor Show

Overview
- Manufacturer: Motor Development International

Powertrain
- Engine: 44P06 with active chamber

Dimensions
- Length: 2.07 m (6.8 ft)
- Width: 1.60 m (5.2 ft)
- Height: 1.74 m (5.7 ft)
- Curb weight: 220 kg (485 lb)

The AIRPod is a compressed-air vehicle in development by Motor Development International. The AIRPod is planned to be produced in three different configurations that will vary the number of seats and amount of cargo storage while keeping the same basic chassis. It is designed as a zero-emission urban vehicle. Prototypes have been tested by Air France-KLM for use as emission-free vehicles in airports.

MDI has been promising production of the AirPod each year since 2000. As of October 2018, not a single production car has been created. Zero Pollution Motors promised production by mid-2019. However, despite several announcements and prototype testing over the years, the vehicle never reached commercial mass production.

== Technical characteristics ==
(Range, mileage, and speed are claimed by MDI with no independent verification)

Technical Characteristics	AIRPod	AIRPod Cargo
Type	Urban carrier without driving licence	
Number of Seats	3–4	1
Length (m)	2.07	
Width (m)	1.60	
Height (m)	1.74	
Turning radius (m)	1.90	
Weight when empty (kg)	220	210
Useful cargo (kg)	-	300
Cargo (m^{3})	-	1.10
Motor	44P06 with active chamber	
Total cylinder volume (cm^{3})	180 (active chamber + expansion chamber)	
Maximum power (kW)	4 kW (5.45 cv) with 18 bars	
Maximum torque (Nm)	15	
Chassis / body	Composite sandwich (glass fiber / polyurethane foam)	
Front wheels	2 wheel "Diabolo"	
Rear axle	Trailing arms	
Tires	Front: 10×4.00-5; Rear: 100/90-16	
Brakes	Rear discs	
Steering	Differential adjustment of read wheel speed	
Energy recovery	Electronically controlled alternators during braking	
Tank	Carbon fiber on thermoplastic	
Tank volume (litres)	175	
Tank pressure (bar)	350	
Stability control	Gyroscopic assisted system with control of trajectory	
Rear view	LCD screen	
Active security	External airbag	
Steering control	Joystick	
Electronics	Onboard Calculator for steering and motor management	
Maximum speed (km/h)	45 km/h without license – 70 km/h with license	
Range in urban cycle (km)	220	
Refuel time (minute)	1.5	
Cost per 100 km (€)	0.5	

== Production model ==
In September 2013, it was claimed that the vehicle would be on sale from summer 2014 with a base model with 100 km range starting at 7000 Euros, and one with an improved engine, that uses some fuel in addition to the compressed air, giving 250 km range for 8000 Euros. The vehicles will be manufactured in Bolotana, Sardinia, Italy. In August 2014, MDI posted photos of a partially completed demonstration assembly line in their Carros R&D facility, and illustrations and descriptions of the proposed finished assembly line. In March 2016, they posted images showing construction of the forthcoming factory in Sardinia as "underway".

=== US production and sales ===
The vehicles were promoted on the US reality television show Shark Tank in May 2015 by Zero Pollution Motors, where Robert Herjavec offered $5 million for a 50% share in the business which proposed to sell the AirPod for $10,000. Zero Pollution Motors owns the right to build a production plant and has proposed setting up a plant in Hawaii. The investment deal fell through because the company did not hold the rights across North America. The company's website said production in Europe was to be scheduled for the first quarter of 2018 and would accept order reservations.

== See also ==
- Compressed-air car
