= Hydrostor =

Canadian energy storage company

Hydrostor is a Canadian company that develops systems of storing energy in the form of compressed air. It was founded in 2010 and is currently headquartered in Toronto, Ontario.

== History ==
Hydrostor was founded in 2010. As of 2024, co-founder Curtis VanWalleghem was the company's CEO.

In 2024, Hydrostor built a compressed air storage facility in Goderich, Ontario. The unit repurposed a deserted salt cave near the Maitland River.

== Energy storage ==
Hydrostor's method of storing energy includes using electric air compressors to compress air and fit it into a container. In order to recover the energy, the compressed air is run through a turbine, generating power. The air compressors are powered by renewable energy.
