= Compressed-air energy storage =

Method for matching variable production with demand

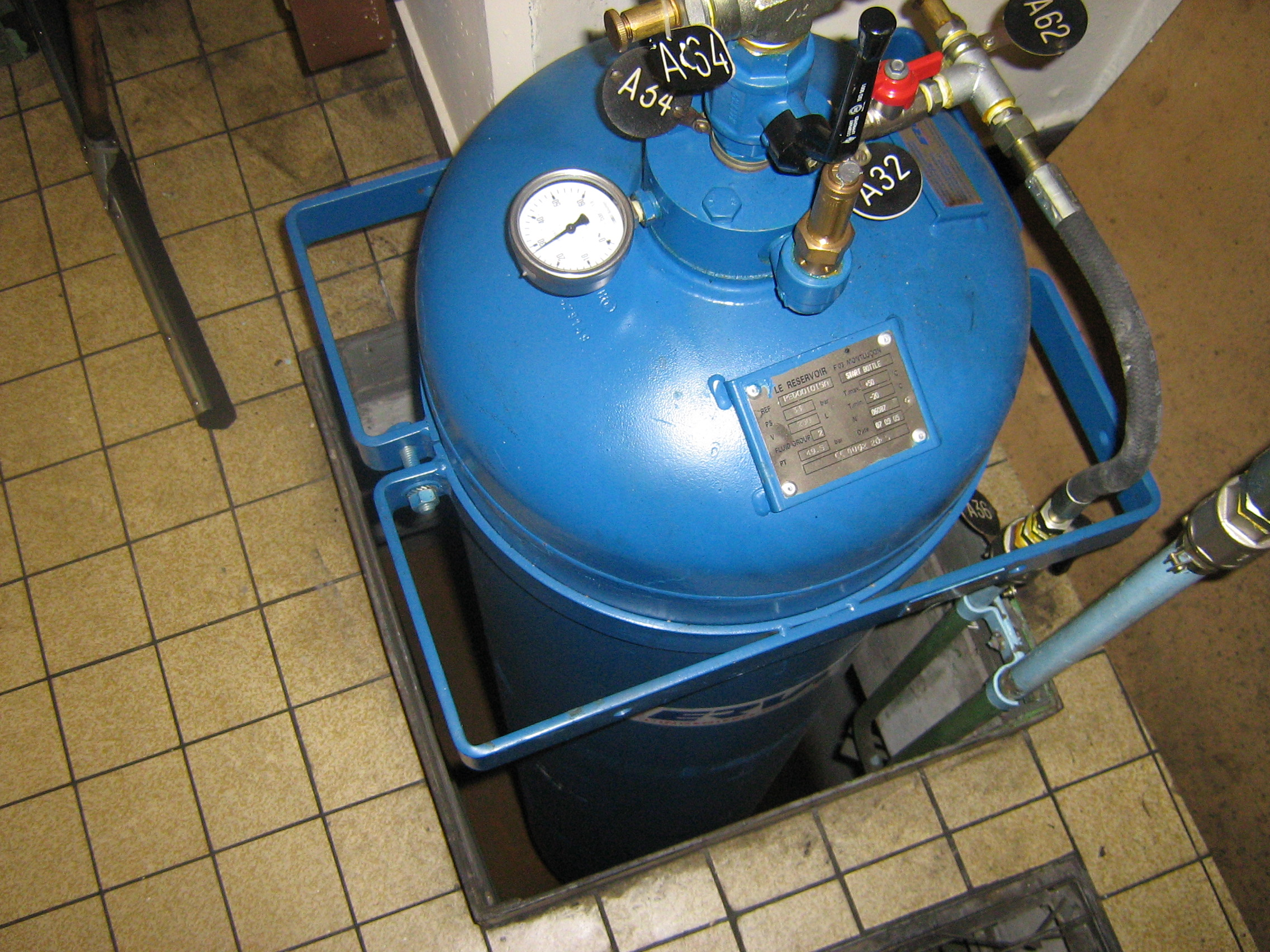
A pressurized air tank used to start a diesel generator set in Paris Metro

Compressed-air-energy storage (CAES) is a way to store energy for later use using compressed air. At a utility scale, energy generated during periods of low demand can be released during peak load periods.

The first utility-scale CAES project was in the Huntorf power plant in Elsfleth, Germany, and is still operational as of 2024. The Huntorf plant was initially developed as a load balancer for fossil-fuel-generated electricity, but the global shift towards renewable energy renewed interest in CAES systems, to help highly intermittent energy sources like photovoltaics and wind satisfy fluctuating electricity demands.

One ongoing challenge in large-scale design is the management of thermal energy, since the compression of air leads to an unwanted temperature increase that not only reduces operational efficiency but can also lead to damage. The main difference between various architectures lies in thermal engineering. On the other hand, small-scale systems have long been used for propulsion of mine locomotives. Contrasted with traditional batteries, compressed-air systems can store energy for longer periods of time and have less upkeep.

== Types ==
Energy from a source such as sunlight is used to compress air, giving it potential energy. The stored potential energy is later converted to electricity that is added to the power grid, even when the original energy source is not available.

Compression of air creates heat; the air is warmer after compression. Expansion removes heat. If no extra heat is added, the air will be much colder after expansion. If the heat generated during compression can be stored and used during expansion, then the efficiency of the storage improves considerably. There are several ways in which a CAES system can deal with heat. Air storage can be adiabatic, diabatic, isothermal, or near-isothermal.

=== Adiabatic ===
Adiabatic storage continues to store the heat energy produced by compression and returns it to the air as it is expanded to generate power. The theoretical efficiency of adiabatic storage approaches 100% with perfect insulation, but in practice, round trip efficiency is expected to be 70%. Heat can be stored in a solid such as concrete or stone, or in a fluid such as hot oil (up to 300 °C) or molten salt solutions (600 °C). Storing the heat in hot water may yield an efficiency around 65%.

Packed beds have been proposed as thermal storage units for adiabatic systems. A study numerically simulated an adiabatic compressed air energy storage system using packed bed thermal energy storage. The efficiency of the simulated system under continuous operation was calculated to be between 70.5% and 71%.

Advancements in adiabatic CAES involve the development of high-efficiency thermal energy storage systems that capture and reuse the heat generated during compression. This innovation has led to system efficiencies exceeding 70%, significantly higher than traditional Diabatic systems.

In 2026, a 2.4 GWh adiabatic CAES plant, the largest in the world at the time, was switched on in Huai'an, China. It consists of two 300 MW units with a 71% conversion efficiency rate.

=== Diabatic ===
Diabatic storage dissipates much of the heat of compression with intercoolers (thus approaching isothermal compression) into the atmosphere as waste, essentially wasting the energy used to perform the work of compression. Upon removal from storage, the temperature of this compressed air is the one indicator of the amount of stored energy that remains in this air. Consequently, if the air temperature is too low for the energy recovery process, then the air must be substantially re-heated prior to expansion in the turbine to power a generator. This reheating can be accomplished with a natural-gas-fired burner for utility-grade storage or with a heated metal mass. As recovery is often most needed when renewable sources are quiescent, the fuel must be burned to make up for the wasted heat. This degrades the efficiency of the storage-recovery cycle. While this approach is relatively simple, the burning of fuel adds to the cost of the recovered electrical energy and compromises the ecological benefits associated with most renewable energy sources. Nevertheless, this is thus far the only system that has been implemented commercially.

The McIntosh, Alabama, CAES plant requires 2.5 MJ of electricity and 1.2 MJ lower heating value (LHV) of gas for each MJ of energy output, corresponding to an energy recovery efficiency of about 27%. A General Electric 7FA 2x1 combined cycle plant, one of the most efficient natural gas plants in operation, uses 1.85 MJ (LHV) of gas per MJ generated, a 54% thermal efficiency.

To improve the efficiency of Diabatic CAES systems, modern designs incorporate heat recovery units that capture waste heat during compression, thereby reducing energy losses and enhancing overall performance.

=== Isothermal ===
Isothermal compression and expansion approaches attempt to maintain operating temperature by constant heat exchange to the environment. In a reciprocating compressor, this can be achieved by using a finned piston and low cycle speeds. Current challenges in effective heat exchangers mean that they are only practical for low power levels. The theoretical efficiency of isothermal energy storage approaches 100% for perfect heat transfer to the environment. In practice, neither of these perfect thermodynamic cycles is obtainable, as some heat losses are unavoidable, leading to a near-isothermal process. Recent developments in isothermal CAES focus on advanced thermal management techniques and materials that maintain constant air temperatures during compression and expansion, minimizing energy losses and improving system efficiency.

=== Near-isothermal ===
Near-isothermal compression (and expansion) is a process in which a gas is compressed in very close proximity to a large incompressible thermal mass such as a heat-absorbing and -releasing structure (HARS) or a water spray. A HARS is usually made up of a series of parallel fins. As the gas is compressed, the heat of compression is rapidly transferred to the thermal mass, so the gas temperature is stabilized. An external cooling circuit is then used to maintain the temperature of the thermal mass. The isothermal efficiency (Z) is a measure of where the process lies between an adiabatic and isothermal process. If the efficiency is 0%, then it is totally adiabatic; with an efficiency of 100%, it is totally isothermal. Typically with a near-isothermal process, an isothermal efficiency of 90–95% can be expected.

=== Hybrid CAES systems ===
Hybrid Compressed Air Energy Storage (H-CAES) systems integrate renewable energy sources, such as wind or solar power, with traditional CAES technology. This integration allows for the storage of excess renewable energy generated during periods of low demand, which can be released during peak demand to enhance grid stability and reduce reliance on fossil fuels. For instance, the Apex CAES Plant in Texas combines wind energy with CAES to provide a consistent energy output, addressing the intermittency of renewable energy sources.

=== Other ===
One implementation of isothermal CAES uses high-, medium-, and low-pressure pistons in series. Each stage is followed by an airblast venturi pump that draws ambient air over an air-to-air (or air-to-seawater) heat exchanger between each expansion stage. Early compressed-air torpedo designs used a similar approach, substituting seawater for air. The venturi warms the exhaust of the preceding stage and admits this preheated air to the following stage. This approach was widely adopted in various compressed-air vehicles such as H. K. Porter, Inc.'s mining locomotives and trams. Here, the heat of compression is effectively stored in the atmosphere (or sea) and returned later on.

== Compressors and expanders ==
Compression can be done with electrically-powered turbo-compressors and expansion with turbo-expanders or air engines driving electrical generators to produce electricity.

== Storage ==
Air storage vessels vary in the thermodynamic conditions of the storage and on the technology used:

1. Constant volume storage (solution-mined caverns, above-ground vessels, aquifers, automotive applications, etc.)
2. Constant pressure storage (underwater pressure vessels, hybrid pumped hydro / compressed air storage)

=== Constant-volume storage ===
This storage system uses a chamber with specific boundaries to store large amounts of air. This means from a thermodynamic point of view that this system is a constant-volume and variable-pressure system. This causes some operational problems for the compressors and turbines, so the pressure variations have to be kept below a certain limit, as do the stresses induced on the storage vessels.

The storage vessel is often a cavern created by solution mining (salt is dissolved in water for extraction) or by using an abandoned mine; use of porous and permeable rock formations (rocks that have interconnected holes, through which liquid or air can pass), such as those in which reservoirs of natural gas are found, has also been studied.

In some cases, an above-ground pipeline was tested as a storage system, giving some good results. Obviously, the cost of the system is higher, but it can be placed wherever the designer chooses, whereas an underground system needs some particular geologic formations (salt domes, aquifers, depleted gas fields, etc.).

=== Constant-pressure storage ===
In this case, the storage vessel is kept at constant pressure, while the gas is contained in a variable-volume vessel. Many types of storage vessels have been proposed, generally relying on liquid displacement to achieve isobaric operation. In such cases, the storage vessel is positioned hundreds of meters below ground level, and the hydrostatic pressure (head) of the water column above the storage vessel maintains the pressure at the desired level.

This configuration allows:

- Improvement of the energy density of the storage system because all the air contained can be used (the pressure is constant in all charge conditions, full or empty, so the turbine has no problem exploiting it, while with constant-volume systems, if the pressure goes below a safety limit, then the system needs to stop).
- Removal of the requirement of throttling prior to the expansion.
- Avoidance of mixing of heat at different temperatures in the Thermal Energy Storage system, which leads to irreversibility.
- Improvement of the efficiency of the turbomachinery, which will work under constant-inlet conditions.
- Use of various geographic locations for the positioning of the CAES plant (coastal lines, floating platforms, etc.).

On the other hand, the cost of this storage system is higher due to the need to position the storage vessel on the bottom of the chosen water reservoir (often the ocean) and due to the cost of the vessel itself.

A different approach consists of burying a large bag buried under several meters of sand instead of water.

Plants operate on a peak-shaving daily cycle, charging at night and discharging during the day. Heating the compressed air using natural gas or geothermal heat to increase the amount of energy being extracted has been studied by the Pacific Northwest National Laboratory.

Compressed-air energy storage can also be employed on a smaller scale, such as exploited by air cars and air-driven locomotives, and can use high-strength (e.g., carbon-fiber) air-storage tanks. In order to retain the energy stored in compressed air, this tank should be thermally isolated from the environment; otherwise, the energy stored will escape in the form of heat, because compressing air raises its temperature.

== Environmental Impact ==
CAES systems are often considered an environmentally friendly alternative to other large-scale energy storage technologies due to their reliance on naturally occurring resources, such as salt caverns for air storage and ambient air as the working medium. Unlike lithium-ion batteries, which require the extraction of finite resources such as lithium and cobalt, CAES has a minimal environmental footprint during its lifecycle.

However, the construction of CAES facilities presents unique challenges. Underground air storage requires geological formations such as salt domes, which are geographically limited. Inappropriate siting or mismanagement during construction can lead to disruptions in local ecosystems, land subsidence, or groundwater contamination.

On the positive side, CAES systems integrated with renewable energy sources contribute to a significant reduction in greenhouse gas emissions by enabling the storage and dispatch of clean energy during peak demand. Additionally, repurposing depleted natural gas fields or other geological formations for air storage can mitigate environmental impacts and extend the usefulness of existing infrastructure.

=== Economic Considerations ===
The cost of implementing CAES systems depends heavily on the geological conditions of the site, the scale of the facility, and the type of CAES process used (adiabatic, diabatic, or isothermal). Initial capital expenditures are significant, often ranging from $500 to $1,200 per kW for large-scale systems. These costs primarily include the development of underground storage caverns, compression and expansion equipment, and thermal energy storage units (for advanced systems).

Despite the high upfront costs, CAES facilities have long operational lifespans, often exceeding 30 years, with low maintenance and operational costs compared to lithium-ion battery storage systems, which require periodic replacements. This long-term cost efficiency makes CAES particularly attractive for electric utility companies and grid operators.

=== Policy and Regulation ===
Market trends suggest growing interest in CAES technology due to increasing renewable energy integration and the need for grid-scale energy storage. Government incentives and declining costs of advanced components, such as high-efficiency compressors and turbines, are further enhancing the economic feasibility of CAES.

Government policies and regulatory frameworks are critical in determining the pace of CAES adoption and development. Countries like Germany and the United States have implemented various incentives, including tax credits and grants, to promote energy storage technologies. For instance, the U.S. Department of Energy's Energy Storage Grand Challenge includes CAES as a key focus area for research and development funding.

One of the significant regulatory hurdles for CAES is the permitting process for underground air storage facilities. Environmental impact assessments, land use approvals, and safety standards for high-pressure storage systems can delay or increase costs for CAES projects. For example, projects sited near urban areas often face additional scrutiny due to concerns about noise pollution, air quality, and potential risks associated with high-pressure air storage.

Internationally, efforts are underway to standardize the design, operation, and safety protocols for CAES systems. Organizations like the International Energy Agency (IEA) and regional bodies such as the European Union have been instrumental in developing frameworks to support the integration of CAES into modern energy grids. As renewable energy adoption accelerates, policies aimed at addressing intermittency challenges will likely prioritize grid-scale solutions like CAES.

== History ==
Citywide compressed air energy systems for delivering mechanical power directly via compressed air have been built since 1870. Cities such as Paris, France; Birmingham, England; Dresden, Rixdorf, and Offenbach, Germany; and Buenos Aires, Argentina, installed such systems. Victor Popp constructed the first systems to power clocks by sending a pulse of air every minute to change their pointer arms. They quickly evolved to deliver power to homes and industries. As of 1896, the Paris system had 2.2 MW of generation distributed at 550 kPa in 50 km of air pipes for motors in light and heavy industry. Usage was measured in cubic meters. The systems were the main source of house-delivered energy in those days and also powered the machines of dentists, seamstresses, printing facilities, and bakeries.

The first utility-scale diabatic compressed-air energy storage project was the 290-megawatt Huntorf plant opened in 1978 in Germany using a salt dome cavern with a capacity of 580 megawatt-hours (2,100 GJ) and a 42% efficiency.

A plant that could store up to 2,860 megawatt-hours (10,300 GJ) (and produce up to 110 MW for 26 hours) was built in McIntosh, Alabama in 1991. The Alabama facility's $65 million cost equals $590 per kW of power capacity and about $23 per kW⋅h of storage capacity. It uses a nineteen-million-cubic-foot (540,000 m^{3}) solution-mined salt cavern to store air at up to 1,100 psi (7,600 kPa). Although the compression phase is approximately 82% efficient, the expansion phase requires the combustion of natural gas at one-third the rate of a gas turbine producing the same amount of electricity at 54% efficiency.

In 2012, General Compression completed construction of a two-megawatt near-isothermal project in Gaines County, Texas, the world's third such project. The project uses no fuel. It appears to have stopped operating in 2016.

In 2017 FLASC from the University of Malta deployed an isothermal compressed energy storage prototype in the Grand Harbour on the Maltese islands. The prototype was a 300W and 530Wh small scale test operating at 11.5bar which achieved more than 96% thermal efficiency. Currently there are ongoing projects to set up these systems for offshore wind energy storage in the Netherlands, and a "one stop shop" for renewable energy and storage designed for small islands to be trialed on Oinousses in Greece.

A 60 MW, 300 MW⋅h facility with 60% efficiency opened in Jiangsu, China, using a salt cavern (2022).

A 2.5 MW, 4 MW⋅h compressed CO_{2} closed-cycle facility started operating in Ottana (Sardinia, Italy) in 2022, and a 20 MW (multi-hour) started operating there in July 2025.

In 2022, Zhangjiakou connected a 100 MW storage system to the grid in north China. It uses supercritical thermal storage, supercritical heat exchange, and high-load compression and expansion technologies. The plant can store 400 MW⋅h with 70.4% efficiency. Construction of a 350 MW, 1.4 GW⋅h salt cave project started in Shandong at a cost of $208 million, operating in 2024 with 64% efficiency. and construction of a four-hour, 700 MW, 2.8 GW⋅h facility started in China in 2024, and a 700 MW / 4,200 MWh cave project in Shanzhou, Sanmenxia (Henan, China) was approved in 2025 for construction in 2026.

== Largest CAES facilities ==
10 largest compressed-air storage power plants by storage capacity
Location	Commissioning date	Energy (MWh)	Power (MW)	Duration (hours)	Efficiency %	Type	Country	Refs
Huai'an	2026	2400	600	4	71	Salt cavern, molten salt	China	
Yingcheng	2025	1500	300	5	70	Salt cavern	China	
Shandong	2024	1400	350		64	Salt cavern	China	
Zhangjiakou	2022	400	100	4	70	above ground tank	China	
Jiangsu	2022	300	60	5	60	Salt cavern	China	
Under construction
Shanzhou		4200	700	6			China	

== Projects ==
In 2009, the US Department of Energy awarded $24.9 million in matching funds for phase one of a 300 MW, $356 million Pacific Gas and Electric Company installation using a saline porous rock formation being developed near Bakersfield in Kern County, California. The goals of the project were to build and validate an advanced design.

In 2010, the US Department of Energy provided $29.4 million in funding to conduct preliminary work on a 150-MW salt-based project being developed by Iberdrola USA in Watkins Glen, New York. The goal is to incorporate smart grid technology to balance renewable intermittent energy sources.

The first adiabatic project, a 200-megawatt facility called ADELE, was planned for construction in Germany (2013) with a target of 70% efficiency by using 600 °C (1,112 °F) air at 100 bars of pressure. This project was delayed for undisclosed reasons until at least 2016.

Storelectric Ltd planned to build a 40-MW 100% renewable energy pilot plant in Cheshire, UK, with 800 MWh of storage capacity (2017).

Hydrostor completed the first commercial A-CAES system in Goderich, Ontario, supplying service with 2.2MW / 10MWh storage to the Ontario Grid (2019). It was the first A-CAES system to achieve commercial operation in decades.

The European-Union-funded RICAS (adiabatic) project in Austria was to use crushed rock to store heat from the compression process to improve efficiency (2020). The system was expected to achieve 70–80% efficiency.

Apex planned a plant for Anderson County, Texas, to go online in 2016. This project has been delayed until at least 2020.

Canadian company Hydrostor planned to build four Advance plants in Toronto, Goderich, Angas, and Rosamond (2020). Some included partial heat storage in water, improving efficiency to 65%.

As of 2022, the Gem project at Rosamond in Kern County, California, was planned to provide 500 MW / 4,000 MWh of storage. The Pecho project in San Luis Obispo, California, was planned to be 400 MW / 3,200 MWh. The Broken Hill project in New South Wales, Australia was 200 MW / 1,600 MWh.

In 2023, Alliant Energy announced plans to construct a 200-MWh compressed CO_{2} facility based on the Sardinia facility in Columbia County, Wisconsin. It will be the first of its kind in the United States.

Compressed air energy storage may be stored in undersea caves in Northern Ireland.

== Storage thermodynamics ==
In order to achieve a near-thermodynamically-reversible process so that most of the energy is saved in the system and can be retrieved, and losses are kept negligible, a near-reversible isothermal process or an isentropic process is desired.

=== Isothermal storage ===
In an isothermal compression process, the gas in the system is kept at a constant temperature throughout. This necessarily requires an exchange of heat with the gas; otherwise, the temperature would rise during charging and drop during discharge. This heat exchange can be achieved by heat exchangers (intercooling) between subsequent stages in the compressor, regulator, and tank. To avoid wasted energy, the intercoolers must be optimized for high heat transfer and low pressure drop. Smaller compressors can approximate isothermal compression even without intercooling, due to the relatively high ratio of surface area to volume of the compression chamber and the resulting improvement in heat dissipation from the compressor body itself.

When one obtains perfect isothermal storage (and discharge), the process is said to be "reversible". This requires that the heat transfer between the surroundings and the gas occur over an infinitesimally small temperature difference. In that case, there is no exergy loss in the heat transfer process, and so the compression work can be completely recovered as expansion work: 100% storage efficiency. However, in practice, there is always a temperature difference in any heat transfer process, and so all practical energy storage obtains efficiencies lower than 100%.

To estimate the compression/expansion work in an isothermal process, it may be assumed that the compressed air obeys the ideal gas law:

$$pV = nRT = \text{constant}.$$

For a process from an initial state A to a final state B, with absolute temperature $T = T_A = T_B$ constant, one finds the work required for compression (negative) or done by the expansion (positive) to be

$$\begin{align}
W_{A\to B} & = \int_{V_A}^{V_B} p \,dV = \int_{V_A}^{V_B} \frac{nRT}{V} dV = nRT \int_{V_A}^{V_B} \frac{1}{V} dV \\
& = nRT (\ln{V_B} - \ln{V_A}) = nRT \ln{\frac{V_B}{V_A}}  = p_A V_A \ln{\frac{p_A}{p_B}} = p_B V_B \ln{\frac{p_A}{p_B}}, \\
\end{align}$$

where $pV = p_A V_A = p_B V_B$, and so $\frac{V_B}{V_A} = \frac{p_A}{p_B}$.

Here $p$ is the absolute pressure, $V_A$ is the (unknown) volume of gas compressed, $V_B$ is the volume of the vessel, $n$ is the amount of substance of gas (mol), and $R$ is the ideal gas constant.

If there is a constant pressure outside of the vessel, which is equal to the starting pressure $p_A$, the positive work of the outer pressure reduces the exploitable energy (negative value). This adds a term to the equation above:

$$W_{A \to B} = p_A V_A \ln{\frac{p_A}{p_B}} + (V_A - V_B) p_A = p_B V_B \ln{\frac{p_A}{p_B}} + (p_B - p_A) V_B.$$

Example

How much energy can be stored in a 1 m^{3} storage vessel at a pressure of 70 bars (7.0 MPa), if the ambient pressure is 1 bar (0.10 MPa)? In this case, the process work is

$W = p_B V_B \ln\frac{p_A}{p_B} + (p_B - p_A) V_B$ =
= 7.0 MPa × 1 m^{3} × ln(0.1 MPa/7.0 MPa) + (7.0 MPa − 0.1 MPa) × 1 m^{3} = −22.8 MJ.

The negative sign means that work is done on the gas by the surroundings. Process irreversibilities (such as in heat transfer) will result in less energy being recovered from the expansion process than is required for the compression process. If the environment is at a constant temperature, for example, then the thermal resistance in the intercoolers will mean that the compression occurs at a temperature somewhat higher than the ambient temperature, and the expansion will occur at a temperature somewhat lower than the ambient temperature. So a perfect isothermal storage system is impossible to achieve.

=== Adiabatic (isentropic) storage ===
An adiabatic process is one where there is no heat transfer between the fluid and the surroundings: the system is insulated against heat transfer. If the process is furthermore internally reversible (frictionless, to the ideal limit), then it will additionally be isentropic.

An adiabatic storage system does away with the intercooling during the compression process and simply allows the gas to heat up during compression and likewise cool down during expansion. This is attractive since the energy losses associated with the heat transfer are avoided, but the downside is that the storage vessel must be insulated against heat loss. It should also be mentioned that real compressors and turbines are not isentropic, but instead have an isentropic efficiency of around 85%. The result is that round-trip storage efficiency for adiabatic systems is also considerably less than perfect.

=== Large storage system thermodynamics ===
Energy storage systems often use large caverns. This is the preferred system design due to the very large volume and thus the large quantity of energy that can be stored with only a small pressure change. The gas is compressed adiabatically with little temperature change (approaching a reversible isothermal system) and heat loss (approaching an isentropic system). This advantage is in addition to the low cost of constructing the gas storage system, using the underground walls to assist in containing the pressure. The cavern space can be insulated to improve efficiency.

Undersea insulated airbags that have similar thermodynamic properties to large cavern storage have been suggested.

== Vehicle applications ==
=== Practical constraints in transportation ===
In order to use air storage in vehicles or aircraft for practical land or air transportation, the energy storage system must be compact and lightweight. Energy density and specific energy are the engineering terms that define these desired qualities.

==== Specific energy, energy density, and efficiency ====
As explained in the thermodynamics of the gas storage section above, compressing air heats it, and expansion cools it. Therefore, practical air engines require heat exchangers in order to avoid excessively high or low temperatures, and even so do not reach ideal constant-temperature conditions or ideal thermal insulation.

Nevertheless, as stated above, it is useful to describe the maximum energy storable using the isothermal case, which works out to about 100 kJ/m^{3} [ ln(P_{A}/P_{B})].

Thus if 1.0 m^{3} of air from the atmosphere is very slowly compressed into a 5 L bottle at 20 MPa (200 bar), then the potential energy stored is 530 kJ. A highly efficient air motor can transfer this into kinetic energy if it runs very slowly and manages to expand the air from its initial 20 MPa pressure down to 100 kPa (bottle completely "empty" at atmospheric pressure). Achieving high efficiency is a technical challenge both due to heat loss to the ambient and to unrecoverable internal gas heat. If the bottle above is emptied to 1 MPa, then the extractable energy is about 300 kJ at the motor shaft.

A standard 20-MPa, 5-L steel bottle has a mass of 7.5 kg, and a superior one 5 kg. High-tensile-strength fibers such as carbon fiber or Kevlar can weigh below 2 kg in this size, consistent with the legal safety codes. One cubic meter of air at 20 °C has a mass of 1.204 kg at standard temperature and pressure. Thus, theoretical specific energies are from roughly 70 kJ/kg at the motor shaft for a plain steel bottle to 180 kJ/kg for an advanced fiber-wound one, whereas practical achievable specific energies for the same containers would be from 40 to 100 kJ/kg.

==== Safety ====
As with most technologies, compressed air has safety concerns, mainly catastrophic tank rupture. Safety regulations make this a rare occurrence at the cost of higher weight and additional safety features such as pressure relief valves. Regulations may limit the legal working pressure to less than 40% of the rupture pressure for steel bottles (for a safety factor of 2.5) and less than 20% for fiber-wound bottles (safety factor 5). Commercial designs adopt the ISO 11439 standard. High-pressure bottles are fairly strong so that they generally do not rupture in vehicle crashes.

=== Comparison with batteries ===
Advanced fiber-reinforced bottles are comparable to the rechargeable lead–acid battery in terms of energy density. Batteries provide nearly-constant voltage over their entire charge level, whereas the pressure varies greatly while using a pressure vessel from full to empty. It is technically challenging to design air engines to maintain high efficiency and sufficient power over a wide range of pressures. Compressed air can transfer power at very high flux rates, which meets the principal acceleration and deceleration objectives of transportation systems, particularly for hybrid vehicles.

Compressed air systems have advantages over conventional batteries, including longer lifetimes of pressure vessels and lower material toxicity. Newer battery designs such as those based on lithium iron phosphate chemistry suffer from neither of these problems. Compressed air costs are potentially lower; however, advanced pressure vessels are costly to develop and safety-test and at present are more expensive than mass-produced batteries.

As with electric storage technology, compressed air is only as "clean" as the source of the energy that it stores. Life cycle assessment addresses the question of overall emissions from a given energy storage technology combined with a given mix of generation on a power grid.

=== Engine ===
A pneumatic motor or compressed-air engine uses the expansion of compressed air to drive the pistons of an engine, turn the axle, or to drive a turbine.

The following methods can increase efficiency:

- A continuous expansion turbine at high efficiency
- Multiple expansion stages
- Use of waste heat, notably in a hybrid heat engine design
- Use of environmental heat

A highly efficient arrangement uses high, medium, and low pressure pistons in series, with each stage followed by an airblast venturi that draws ambient air over an air-to-air heat exchanger. This warms the exhaust of the preceding stage and admits this preheated air to the following stage. The only exhaust gas from each stage is cold air, which can be as cold as −15 °C (5 °F); the cold air may be used for air conditioning in a car.

Additional heat can be supplied by burning fuel, as in 1904 for the Whitehead torpedo. This improves the range and speed available for a given tank volume at the cost of the additional fuel.

==== Cars ====
Since about 1990, several companies have claimed to be developing compressed-air cars, but none is available. Typically, the main claimed advantages are no roadside pollution, low cost, use of cooking oil for lubrication, and integrated air conditioning.

The time required to refill a depleted tank is important for vehicle applications. "Volume transfer" moves pre-compressed air from a stationary tank to the vehicle tank almost instantaneously. Alternatively, a stationary or on-board compressor can compress air on demand, possibly requiring several hours.

==== Ships ====
Large marine diesel engines have started using compressed air, typically stored in large bottles between 20 and 30 bar, acting directly on the pistons via special starting valves to turn the crankshaft prior to beginning fuel injection. This arrangement is more compact and cheaper than an electric starter motor would be at such scales and able to supply the necessary burst of extremely high power without placing a prohibitive load on the ship's electrical generators and distribution system. Compressed air is commonly also used, at lower pressures, to control the engine and act as the spring force acting on the cylinder exhaust valves, and to operate other auxiliary systems and power tools on board, sometimes including pneumatic PID controllers. One advantage of this approach is that, in the event of an electrical blackout, ship systems powered by stored compressed air can continue functioning uninterrupted, and generators can be restarted without an electrical supply. Another is that pneumatic tools can be used in commonly-wet environments without the risk of electric shock.

==== Hybrid vehicles ====
While the air storage system offers a relatively low power density and vehicle range, its high efficiency is attractive for hybrid vehicles that use a conventional internal combustion engine as the main power source. The air storage can be used for regenerative braking and to optimize the cycle of the piston engine, which is not equally efficient at all power/RPM levels.

Bosch and PSA Peugeot Citroën have developed a hybrid system that uses hydraulics as a way to transfer energy to and from a compressed nitrogen tank. An up-to-45% reduction in fuel consumption is claimed, corresponding to 2.9 L / 100 km (81 mpg, 69 g CO_{2}/km) on the New European Driving Cycle (NEDC) for a compact frame like Peugeot 208. The system is claimed to be much more affordable than competing electric and flywheel KERS systems and is expected on road cars by 2016.

=== History of air engines ===
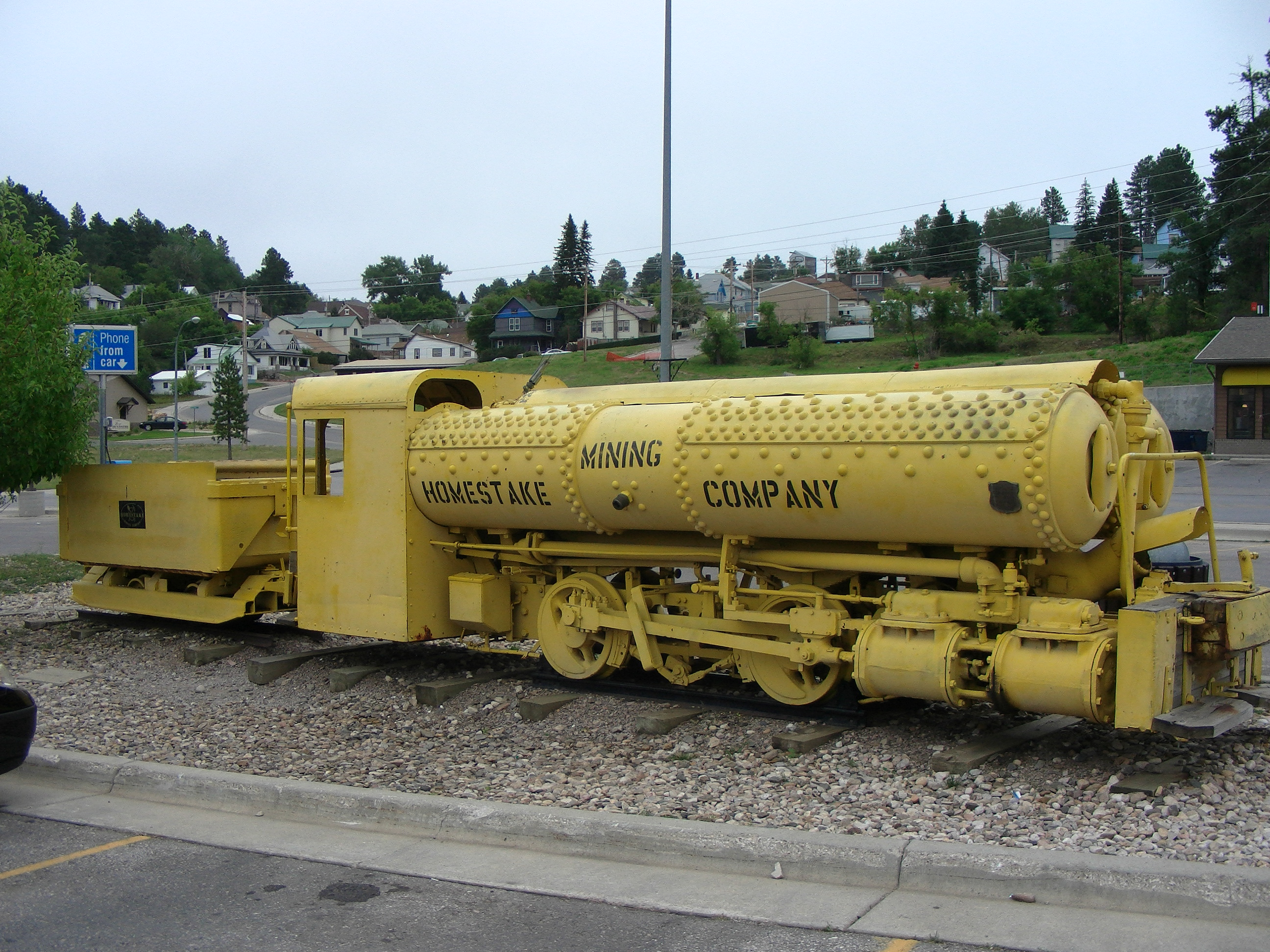
A compressed air locomotive by H. K. Porter, Inc., in use at the Homestake Mine between 1928 and 1961

Air engines have been used since the 19th century to power mine locomotives, pumps, drills, and trams, via centralized, city-level distribution. Racecars use compressed air to start their internal combustion engine (ICE), and large diesel engines may have starting pneumatic motors.

== Types of systems ==
=== Hybrid systems ===
Brayton cycle engines compress and heat air with a fuel suitable for an internal combustion engine. For example, burning natural gas or biogas heats compressed air, and then a conventional gas turbine engine or the rear portion of a jet engine expands it to produce work.

Compressed air engines can recharge an electric battery. The apparently-defunct Energine promoted its Pne-PHEV or Pneumatic Plug-in Hybrid Electric Vehicle-system.

==== Existing hybrid systems ====
Huntorf, Germany in 1978, and McIntosh, Alabama, U.S. in 1991 commissioned hybrid power plants. Both systems use off-peak energy for air compression and burn natural gas in the compressed air during the power-generating phase.

==== Future hybrid systems ====
The Iowa Stored Energy Park (ISEP) would have used aquifer storage rather than cavern storage. The ISEP was an innovative, 270-megawatt, $400 million compressed air energy storage (CAES) project proposed for in-service near Des Moines, Iowa, in 2015. The project was terminated after eight years in development because of site geological limitation, according to the U.S. Department of Energy.

Additional facilities are under development in Norton, Ohio. FirstEnergy, an Akron, Ohio, electric utility, obtained development rights to the 2,700-MW Norton project in November 2009.

The RICAS2020 project attempts to use an abandoned mine for adiabatic CAES with heat recovery. The compression heat is stored in a tunnel section filled with loose stones, so the compressed air is nearly cool when entering the main pressure storage chamber. The cool compressed air regains the heat stored in the stones when released back through a surface turbine, leading to higher overall efficiency. A two-stage process has theoretical higher efficiency of around 70%.

=== Underwater storage ===
==== Bag/tank ====
Deep water in lakes and the ocean can provide pressure without requiring high-pressure vessels or drilling. The air goes into inexpensive, flexible containers such as plastic bags. Obstacles include the limited number of suitable locations and the need for high-pressure pipelines between the surface and the containers. Given the low cost of the containers, great pressure (and great depth) may not be as important. A key benefit of such systems is that charge and discharge pressures are a constant function of depth. Carnot inefficiencies can be increased by using multiple charge and discharge stages and using inexpensive heat sources and sinks such as cold water from rivers or hot water from solar ponds.

==== Hydroelectric ====
A nearly isobaric solution is possible by using the compressed gas to drive a hydroelectric system. This solution requires large pressure tanks on land (as well as underwater airbags). Hydrogen gas is the preferred fluid, since other gases suffer from substantial hydrostatic pressures at even relatively modest depths (~500 meters).

European electrical utility company E.ON has provided €1.4 million (£1.1 million) in funding to develop undersea air storage bags. Hydrostor in Canada is developing a commercial system of underwater storage "accumulators" for compressed air energy storage, starting at the 1- to 4-MW scale.

==== Buoy ====
When excess wind energy is available from offshore wind turbines, a spool-tethered buoy can be pushed below the surface. When electricity demand rises, the buoy is allowed to rise towards the surface, generating power.

=== Nearly isothermal compression ===
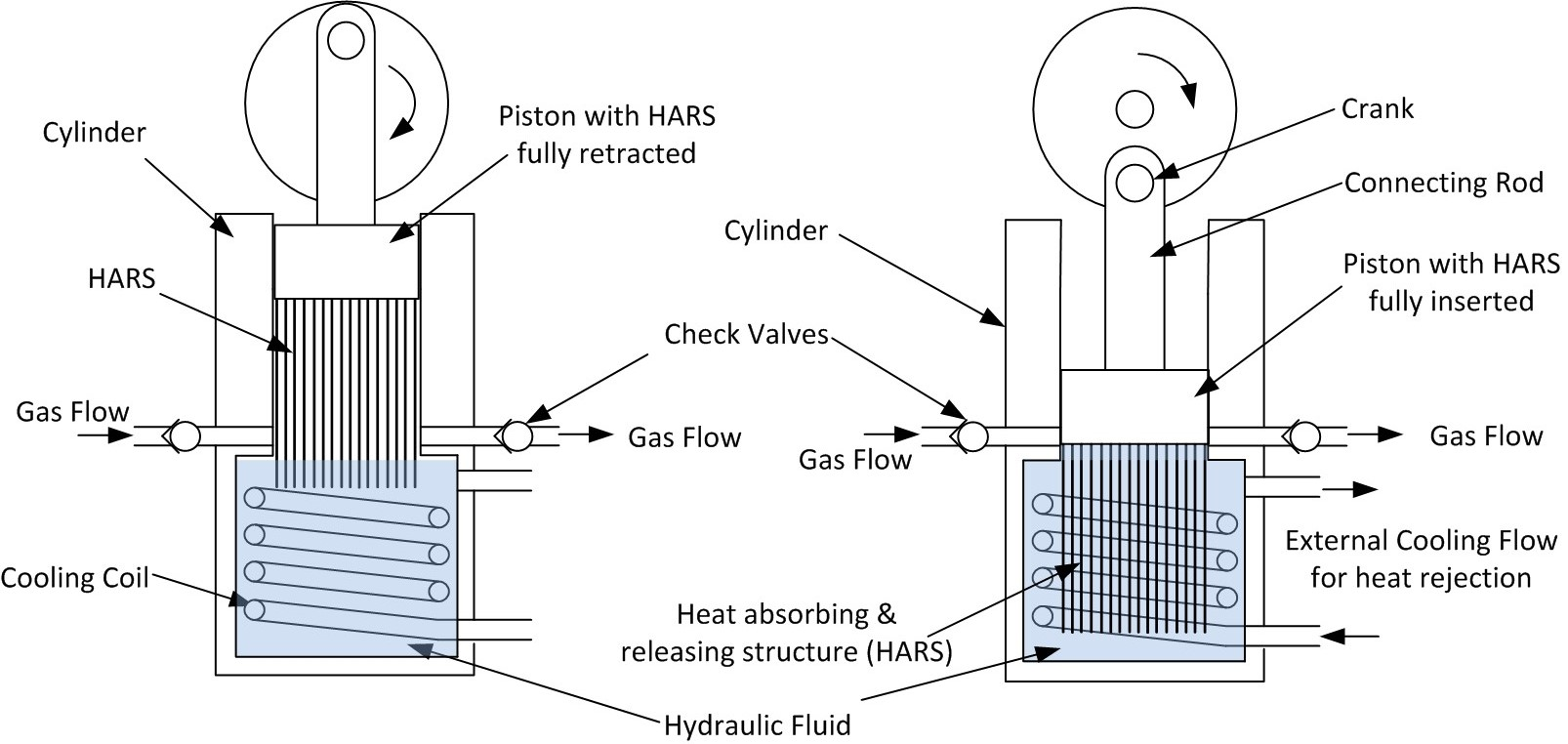
Schematic views of a nearly isothermal compressor and expander. Left view with the piston fully retracted, right view with the piston fully inserted.

A number of methods of nearly isothermal compression are being developed. Fluid Mechanics has a system with a heat absorbing and releasing structure (HARS) attached to a reciprocating piston. Light Sail injects a water spray into a reciprocating cylinder. SustainX uses an air-water foam mix inside a semi-custom, 120-rpm compressor/expander. All these systems ensure that the air is compressed with high thermal diffusivity compared to the speed of compression. Typically these compressors can run at speeds up to 1000 rpm. To ensure high thermal diffusivity, the average distance a gas molecule is from a heat-absorbing surface is about 0.5 mm. These nearly-isothermal compressors can also be used as nearly-isothermal expanders and are being developed to improve the round-trip efficiency of CAES.

== See also ==
- Alternative fuel vehicle
- Fireless locomotive
- Grid energy storage
- Hydraulic accumulator
- List of energy storage power plants
- List of long-duration energy storage technologies
- Pneumatics
- Zero-emissions vehicle
- Cryogenic energy storage
- Compressed-air engine
