= Angelo Di Pietro (inventor) =

Italian engineer

Angelo Di Pietro (born 1950 in Avellino, Italy) is an engine designer who developed the Di Pietro Motor air engine.

== Life ==
He qualified as Congegnatore Meccanico in Avellino and moved to Stuttgart to work on the pistonless rotary Wankel engine at the Daimler-Benz AG research laboratories 1969 and 1970. In 1971, he migrated to Australia where he established a construction engineering company. From his early experience with Wankel rotary engines, Angelo became interested in developing a more efficient engine than the traditional reciprocating internal combustion engine, and he has worked on various alternative concepts intermittently over the last 30 years. In 1999, developed a rotary motor which runs on compressed air. The engine was called the Angelo Di Pietro Rotary Positive Displacement Air Engine and Di Pietro claims that his engine is 100% more efficient than competitors' products and that the reduction in friction will allow the engine to turn with a pressure of 1 psi.

== Rotary motor ==
The Di Pietro Motor

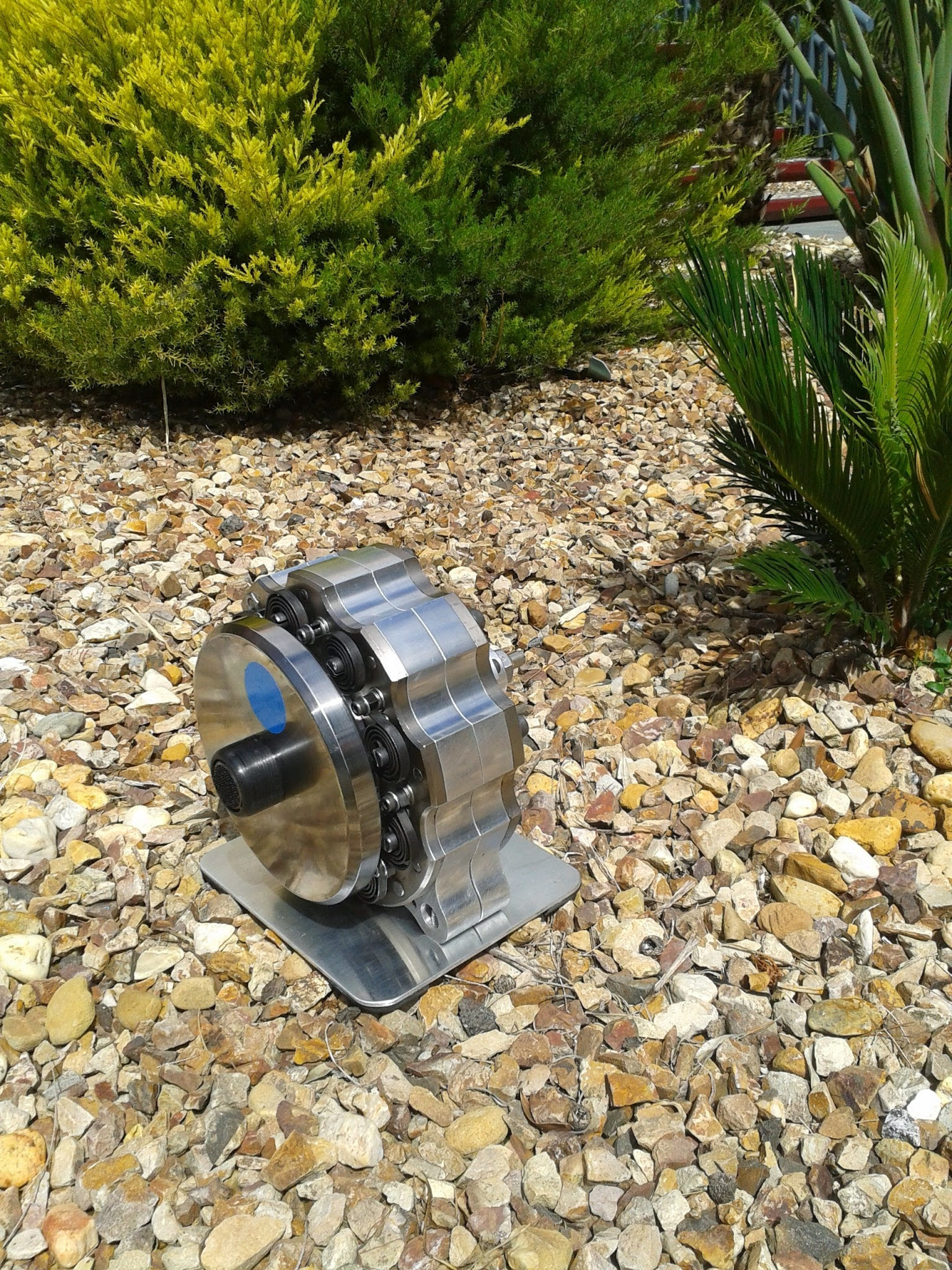
Motor with 9 expansion chambers.

Labeled drawing with 6 expansion chambers

Animation with 6 expansion chambers

The Di Pietro Motor, developed by the Australian company EngineAir, is a positive displacement pneumatic rotary engine powered by compressed air.

The CA-patent for this engine was published in 2001. The US-patent for this engine was granted in 2005.

Unlike other rotary engines, the Di Pietro Motor uses a simple cylindrical rotary piston (shaft driver) which rolls, with almost no friction, inside a cylindrical stator. Only 1 pound per square inch (6.9 kPa) psi (≈ 6,8 kPa) of pressure is needed to overcome the friction.

The space between stator and rotor is divided into 6 expansion chambers by pivoting dividers. These dividers follow the motion of the shaft driver as it rolls around the stator wall. The cylindrical shaft driver, forced by the air pressure on its outer wall, moves eccentrically, thereby driving the motor shaft by means of two rolling elements mounted on bearings on the shaft. The rolling motion of the shaft driver inside the stator is cushioned by a thin air film. Timing and duration of the air inlet and exhaust is governed by a slotted timer which is mounted on the output shaft and rotates at the same speed as the motor.

Variation of performance parameters of the motor is achieved by varying the time during which the air is allowed to enter the chamber: A longer air inlet period allows more air to flow into the chamber and therefore results in more torque. A shorter inlet period will limit the air supply and allows the air in the chamber to perform expansion work at a higher efficiency. In this way compressed air (energy) consumption can be exchanged for higher torque and power output depending on the requirements of the application (this is identical to function of the cutoff control in a steam engine).

The Di Pietro motor can be used in boats, cars, burden carriers, and other vehicles.

== See also ==
- Compressed-air engine
