= Regenerative shock absorber =

Shock absorber that recovers energy during suspension movement

A regenerative shock absorber is a type of shock absorber that converts parasitic intermittent linear motion and vibration into useful energy, such as electricity. Conventional shock absorbers simply dissipate this energy as heat.

In electric or hybrid vehicles, electricity generated by the shock absorber can be used to extend battery life by powering the drivetrain. In non-electric vehicles, it can power accessories like air conditioning. Several systems are still in development and not yet in production vehicles.

== Electromagnetic ==
A patent for such a device was filed in 2005. This type of system uses a linear motor/generator consisting of a stack of permanent magnets and coils to generate electricity. This system was further developed at Tufts University and has been licensed to Electric Truck, LLC. Preliminary data suggests 20% to 70% of the energy normally lost in the suspension can be recaptured with this system.

A system developed at Swinburne University of Technology used DC electromagnetic machines as damping elements to generate energy for storage in conventional batteries. This system utilized a device based on similar principles to a 'step-up' (boost) DC-DC converter. The design offered the ability to optimize the energy conversion efficiency of the system and also allow the ability to control the damping coefficient of the damper, such that the system could act as a semi-active damper.

== Hydraulic ==
A system developed at MIT uses hydraulic pistons to force fluid through a turbine coupled to a generator. The system is controlled by active electronics which optimize damping, which the inventors claim also results in a smoother ride compared to a conventional suspension. They calculate that a large company like Walmart could save $13 million annually by converting their trucks.

Another system has been developed by a team at New York State University.

== See also ==
- Regenerative brake
