= Pneumatic motor =

Compressed-air engine

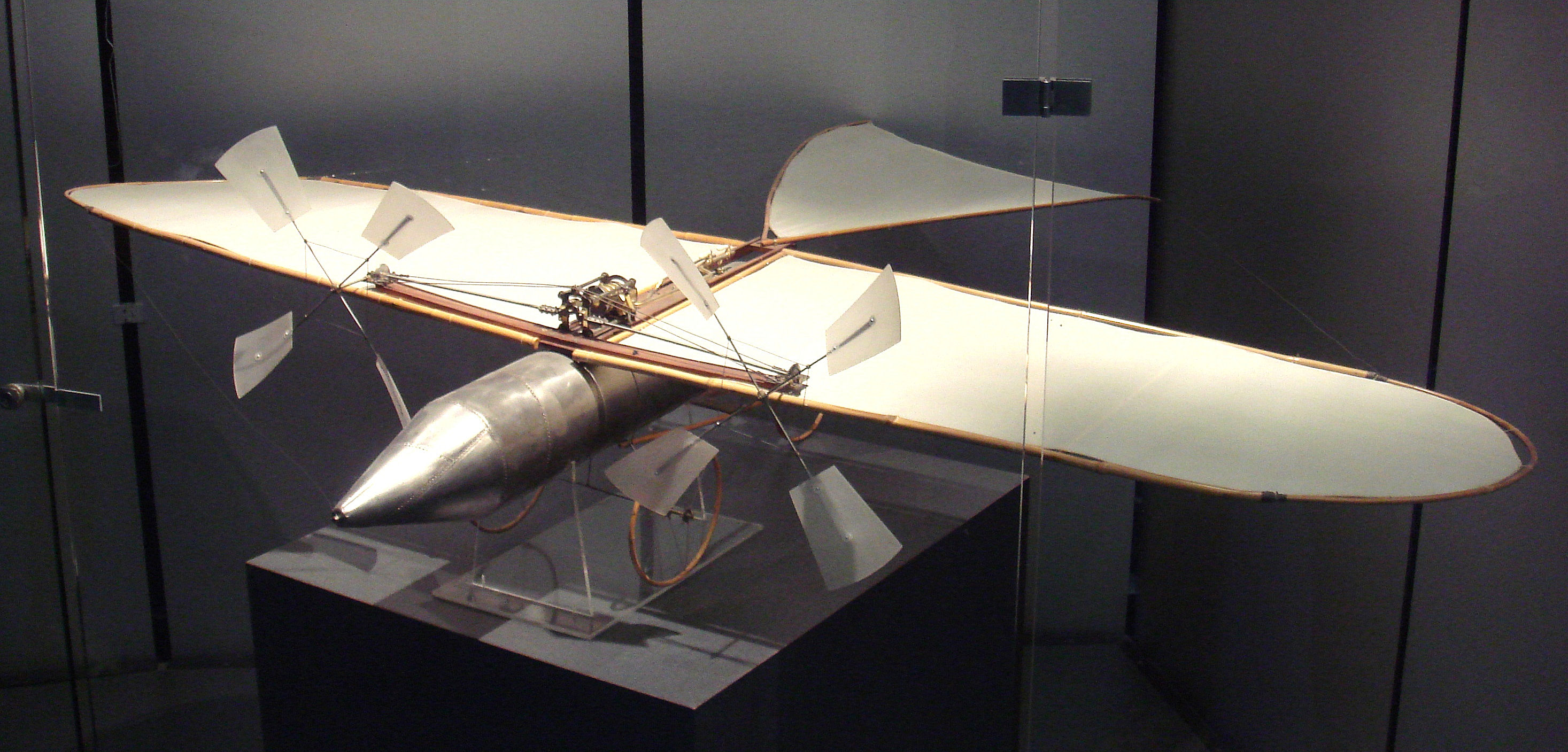
Victor Tatin's 1879 Aéroplane used a compressed-air engine for propulsion. Original craft, at Musée de l'Air et de l'Espace.

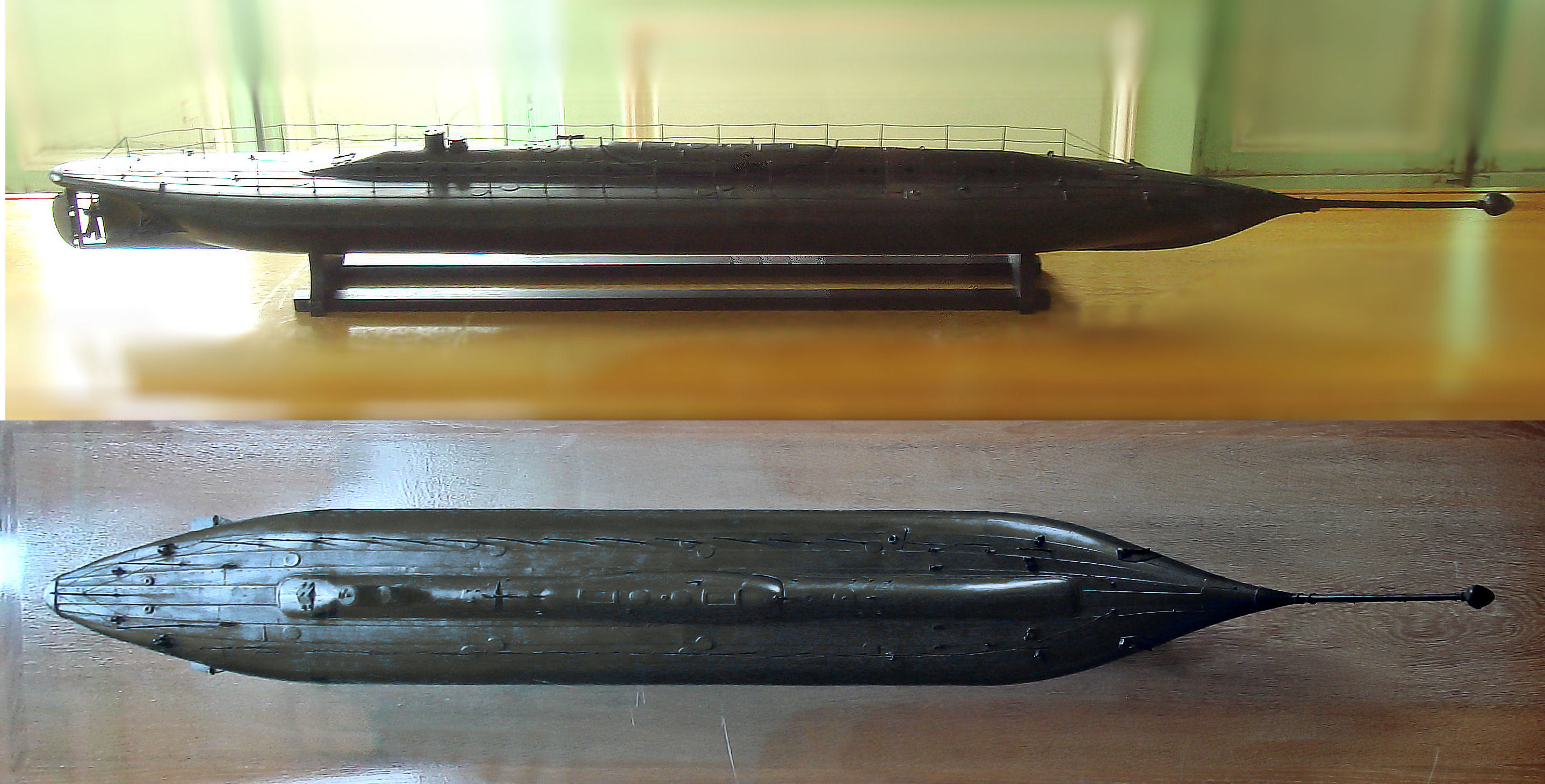
The first mechanically powered submarine, the 1863 French submarine Plongeur, used a compressed-air engine. Musée de la Marine (Rochefort).

A pneumatic motor (air motor), or compressed-air engine, is a type of motor which does mechanical work by expanding compressed air. Pneumatic motors generally convert the compressed-air energy to mechanical work through either linear or rotary motion. Linear motion can come from either a diaphragm or piston actuator, while rotary motion is supplied by either a vane type air motor, piston air motor, air turbine or gear type motor.

Pneumatic motors have existed in many forms over the past two centuries, ranging in size from hand-held motors to engines of up to several hundred horsepower. Some types rely on pistons and cylinders; others on slotted rotors with vanes (vane motors) and others use turbines. Many compressed-air engines improve their performance by heating the incoming air or the engine itself. Pneumatic motors have found widespread success in the hand-held tool industry, but are also used stationary in a wide range of industrial applications. Continual attempts are being made to expand their use to the transportation industry. However, pneumatic motors must overcome inefficiencies before being seen as a viable option in the transportation industry.

== Classification ==
=== Linear ===
In order to achieve linear motion from compressed air, a system of pistons is most commonly used. The compressed air is fed into an air-tight chamber that houses the shaft of the piston. Also inside this chamber a spring is coiled around the shaft of the piston in order to hold the chamber completely open when air is not being pumped into the chamber. As air is fed into the chamber the force on the piston shaft begins to overcome the force being exerted on the spring. As more air is fed into the chamber, the pressure increases and the piston begins to move down the chamber. When it reaches its maximum length the air pressure is released from the chamber, and the spring completes the cycle by closing off the chamber to return to its original position; this cycle repeats as long as air pressure is cycled.

Piston motors are the most commonly used in hydraulic systems. Essentially, piston motors are the same as hydraulic motors except they are used to convert hydraulic energy into mechanical energy.

Piston motors are often used in series of two, three, four, five, or six cylinders that are enclosed in a housing. This allows for more power to be delivered by the pistons because several motors are in sync with each other at certain times of their cycle.

The practical mechanical efficiencies attained by a piston air motor are between 40–50%.

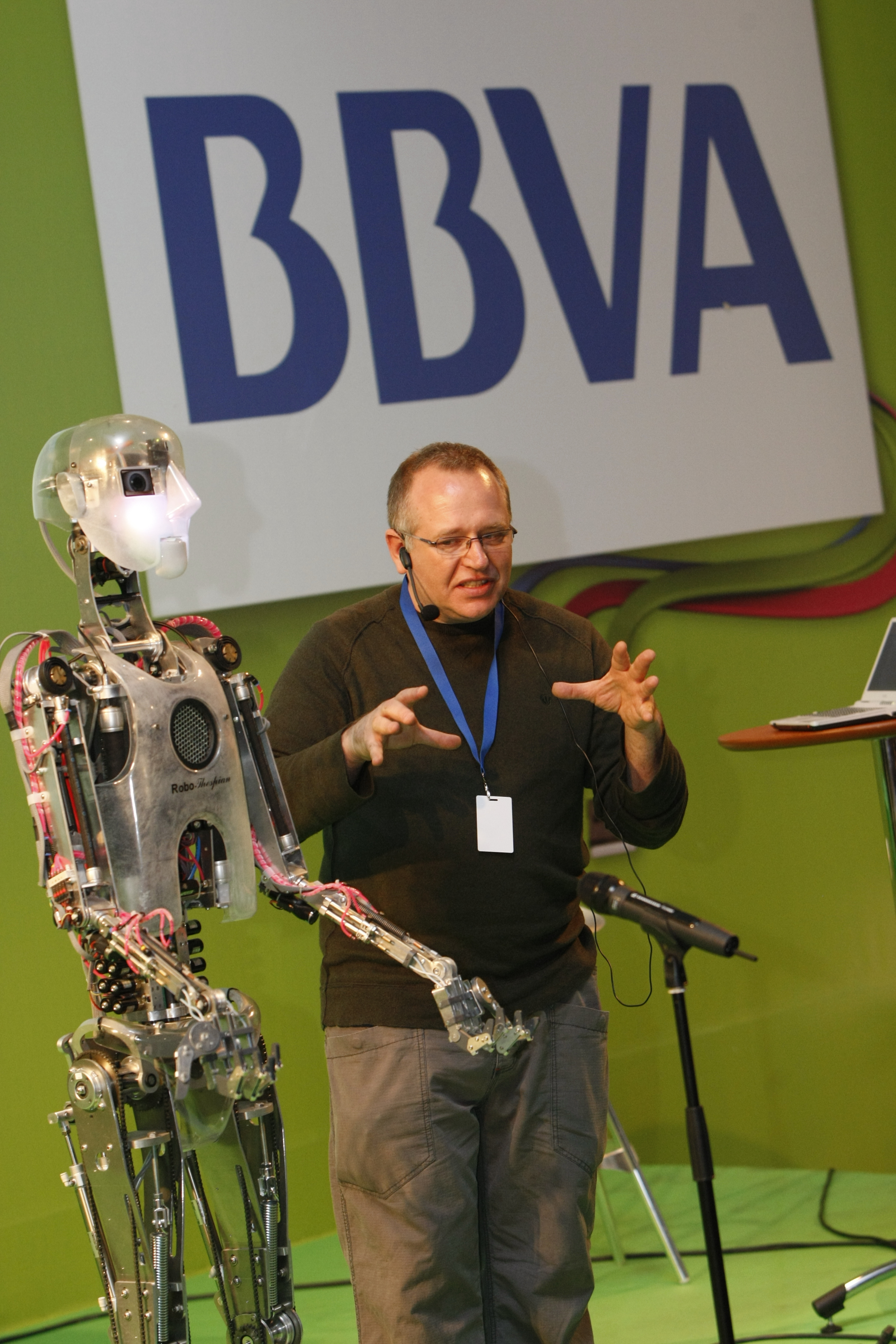
The Robot Robothespian with linear motors in its biceps

=== Rotary vane motors ===
Vane-type motor

A type of pneumatic motor, known as a rotary vane motor, uses air to produce rotational motion to a shaft. The rotating element is a slotted rotor which is mounted on a drive shaft. Each slot of the rotor is fitted with a freely sliding rectangular vane. The vanes are extended to the housing walls using springs, cam action, or air pressure, depending on the motor design. Air is pumped through the motor input which pushes on the vanes creating the rotational motion of the central shaft. Rotation speeds can vary between 100 and 25,000 rpm depending on several factors which include the amount of air pressure at the motor inlet and the diameter of the housing.

One application for vane-type air motors is to start large industrial diesel or natural gas engines. Stored energy in the form of compressed air, nitrogen or natural gas enters the sealed motor chamber and exerts pressure against the vanes of a rotor. This causes the rotor to turn at high speed. Because the engine flywheel requires a great deal of torque to start the engine, reduction gears are used. Reduction gears create high torque levels with the lower amounts of energy input. These reduction gears allow for sufficient torque to be generated by the engine flywheel while it is engaged by the pinion gear of the air motor or air starter.

=== Turbine motors ===
Air turbines are used to spin the burr in high-speed dental handpieces, at speeds over 180,000 rpm, but with limited torque. A turbine is small enough to fit in the tip of a handpiece without significantly adding to the weight.

== Application ==
A widespread application of pneumatic motors is in hand-held tools, impact wrenches, pulse tools, screwdrivers, nut runners, drills, grinders, sanders and so on. Pneumatic motors are also used stationary in a wide range of industrial applications. Though overall energy efficiency of pneumatics tools is low and they require access to a compressed-air source, there are several advantages over electric tools. They offer greater power density (a smaller pneumatic motor can provide the same amount of power as a larger electric motor), do not require an auxiliary speed controller (adding to its compactness), generate less heat, and can be used in more volatile atmospheres as they do not require electric power and do not create sparks. They can be loaded to stop with full torque without damage. The efficiency of a rotary piston engine is highly dependent on mechanical energy losses. The value of mechanical losses, according to various estimates, can be 20% of the energy supplied to the engine. At the same time it was experimentally shown that efficiency of a motor can be increased by the usage of anti-friction additives to the lubricating oil.

Historically, many individuals have tried to apply pneumatic motors to the transportation industry. Guy Negre, CEO and founder of Zero Pollution Motors, has pioneered this field since the late 1980s. Recently Engineair has also developed a rotary motor for use in automobiles. Engineair places the motor immediately beside the wheel of the vehicle and uses no intermediate parts to transmit motion which means almost all of the motor's energy is used to rotate the wheel.

== History in transportation ==
The pneumatic motor was first applied to the field of transportation in the mid-19th century. Though little is known about the first recorded compressed-air vehicle, it is said that the Frenchmen Andraud and Tessie of Motay ran a car powered by a pneumatic motor on a test track in Chaillot, France, on 9 July 1840. Although the car test was reported to have been successful, the pair did not explore further expansion of the design.

The first successful application of the pneumatic motor in transportation was the Mekarski system air engine used in locomotives. Mekarski's innovative engine overcame cooling that accompanies air expansion by heating air in a small boiler prior to use. The Tramway de Nantes, located in Nantes, France, was noted for being the first to use Mekarski engines to power their fleet of locomotives. The tramway began operation on December 13, 1879, and continues to operate today, although the pneumatic trams were replaced in 1917 by more efficient and modern electrical trams.

American Charles Hodges also found success with pneumatic motors in the locomotive industry. In 1911 he designed a pneumatic locomotive and sold the patent to the H.K. Porter Company in Pittsburgh for use in coal mines. Because pneumatic motors do not use combustion they were a much safer option in the coal industry.

Some companies such as Tata Motors have claimed to be developing compressed-air cars, but none are actually available for purchase or even independent testing.

== Tools ==
Impact wrenches, pulse tools, torque wrenches, screwdrivers, drills, grinders, die grinders, sanders, dental drills, tire changers and other pneumatic tools use a variety of air motors. These include vane type motors, turbines and piston motors.

== Torpedoes ==
Most successful early forms of self-propelled torpedoes used high-pressure compressed air, although this was superseded by internal or external combustion engines, steam engines (driven by the catalytic decomposition of hydrogen peroxide), or electric motors.

== Railways ==
Compressed-air engines were used in trams and shunters, and eventually found a successful niche in mining locomotives, although in the end they were replaced by electric trains, underground. Over the years designs increased in complexity, resulting in a triple expansion engine with air-to-air reheaters between each stage. For more information see Fireless locomotive and Mekarski system.

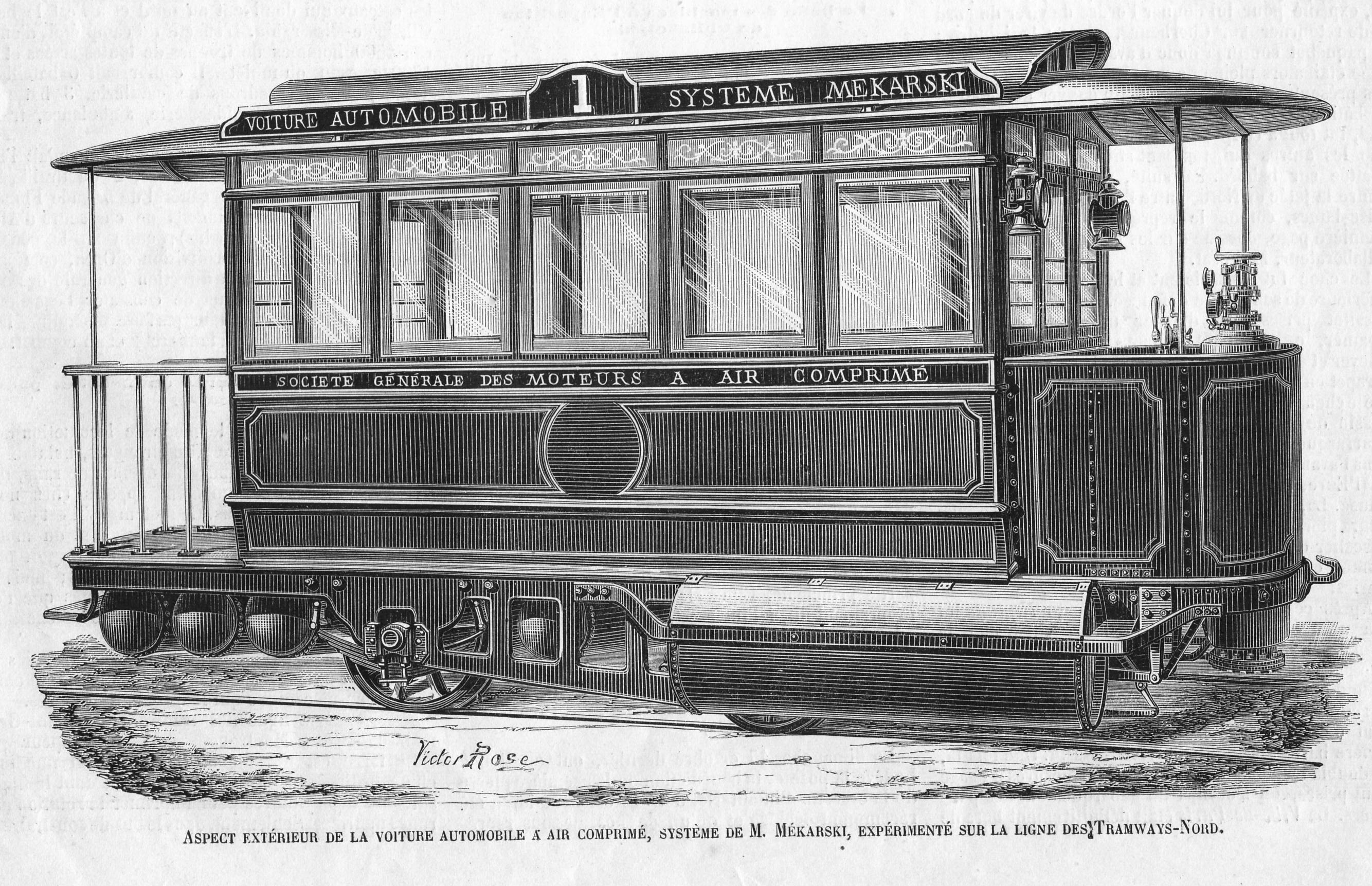
Mekarski compressed air tram, 1875

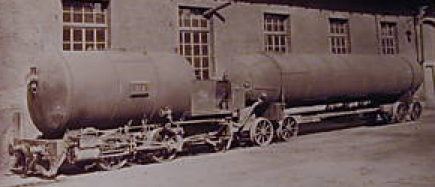
Pneumatic Locomotive with attached pressure container used during the construction of the Gotthard Rail Tunnel 1872-1880.

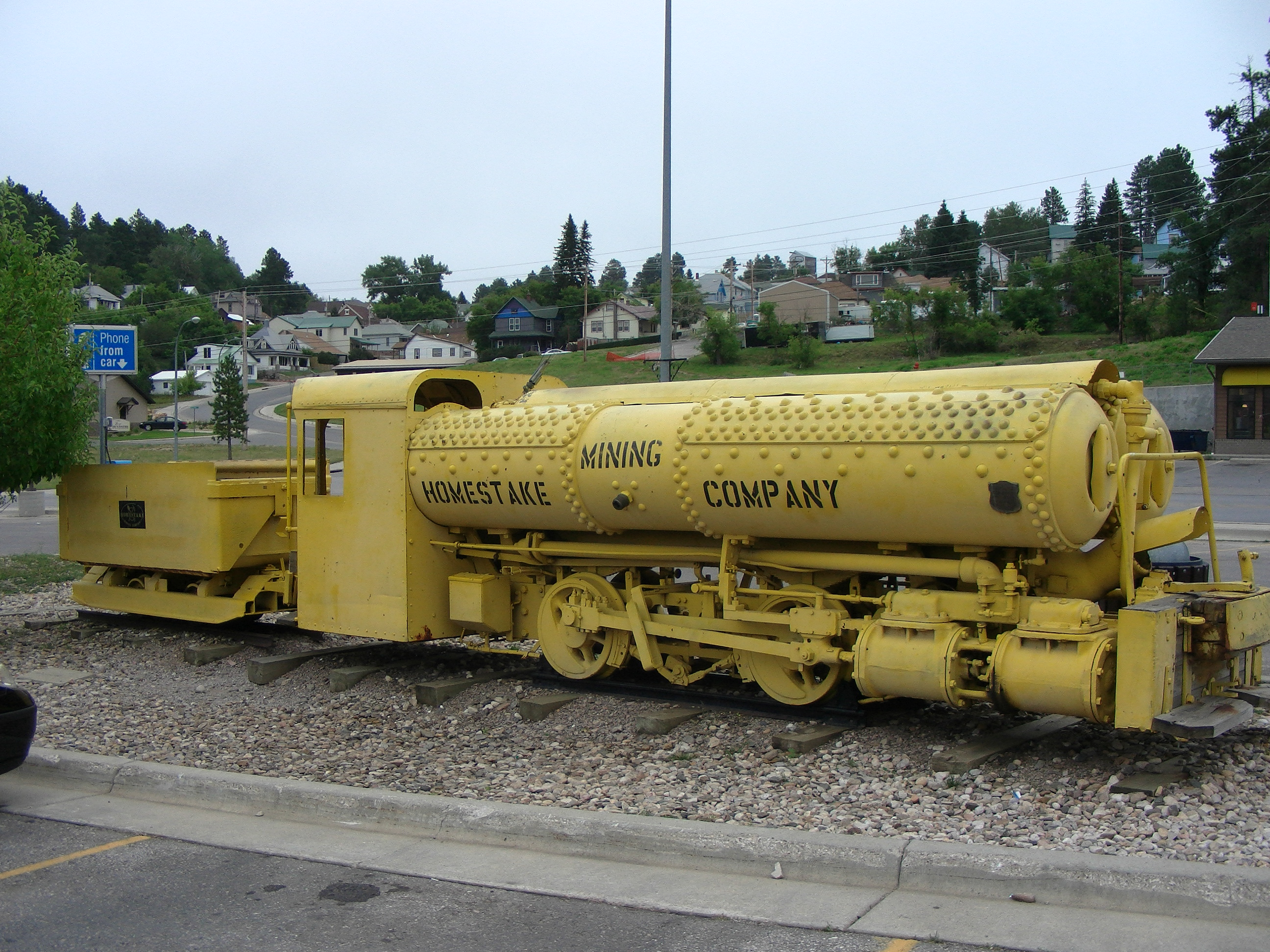
A compressed air locomotive by H.K. Porter, Inc., in use at the Homestake Mine, South Dakota, between 1928 and 1961

== Flight ==
Water rockets use compressed air to power their water jet and generate thrust; they are used as toys.

Air Hogs, a toy brand, also uses compressed air to power piston engines in toy airplanes (and some other toy vehicles).

== Automotive ==
There is currently some interest in developing air cars. Several engines have been proposed for these, although none have demonstrated the performance and long life needed for personal transport.

=== Energine ===
The Energine Corporation was a South Korean company that claimed to deliver fully assembled cars running on a hybrid compressed air and electric engine. The compressed-air engine is used to activate an alternator, which extends the autonomous operating capacity of the car. The CEO was arrested for fraudulently promoting air motors with false claims.

=== EngineAir ===
EngineAir, an Australian company, is making a rotary engine powered by compressed air, called The Di Pietro motor. The Di Pietro motor concept is based on a rotary piston. Different from existing rotary engines, the Di Pietro motor uses a simple cylindrical rotary piston (shaft driver) which rolls, with little friction, inside the cylindrical stator.

It can be used in boats, cars, burden carriers and other vehicles. Only 1 psi (≈ 6,8 kPa) of pressure is needed to overcome the friction. The engine was also featured on the ABC's New Inventors programme in Australia on 24 March 2004.

=== K'Airmobiles ===
K'Airmobiles vehicles were intended to be commercialized from a project developed in France in 2006–2007 by a small group of researchers. However, the project has not been able to gather the necessary funds.

People should note that, meantime, the team has recognized the physical impossibility to use on-board stored compressed air due to its poor energy capacity and the thermal losses resulting from the expansion of the gas.

These days, using the patent pending 'K'Air Generator', converted to work as a compressed-gas motor, the project should be launched in 2010, thanks to a North American group of investors, but for the purpose of developing first a green energy power system.

=== MDI ===
In the original Nègre air engine, one piston compresses air from the atmosphere to mix with the stored compressed air (which will cool drastically as it expands). This mixture drives the second piston, providing the actual engine power. MDI's engine works with constant torque, and the only way to change the torque to the wheels is to use a pulley transmission of constant variation, losing some efficiency. When vehicle is stopped, MDI's engine had to be on and working, losing energy. In 2001–2004 MDI switched to a design similar to that described in Regusci's patents (see below), which date back to 1990.

It has been reported in 2008 that Indian car manufacturer Tata was looking at an MDI compressed-air engine as an option on its low priced Nano automobiles. Tata announced in 2009 that the compressed-air car was proving difficult to develop due to its low range and problems with low engine temperatures.

=== Quasiturbine ===
The pneumatic quasiturbine engine is a compressed-air pistonless rotary engine using a rhomboidal-shaped rotor whose sides are hinged at the vertices.

The quasiturbine has been demonstrated as a pneumatic engine using stored compressed air.

It can also take advantage of the energy amplification possible from using available external heat, such as solar energy.

The quasiturbine rotates from pressure as low as 0.1 atm (1.47psi).

Since the quasiturbine is a pure expansion engine, while the Wankel and most other rotary engines are not, it is well-suited as a compressed fluid engine, air engine or air motor.

=== Regusci ===
Armando Regusci's version of the air engine couples the transmission system directly to the wheel, and has variable torque from zero to the maximum, enhancing efficiency. Regusci's patents date from 1990.

=== Team Psycho-Active ===
Psycho-Active is developing a multi-fuel/air-hybrid chassis which is intended to serve as the foundation for a line of automobiles. Claimed performance is 50 hp/litre. The compressed air motor they use is called the DBRE or Ducted Blade Rotary Engine.

== Defunct air engine designs ==
=== Conger motor ===
Milton M. Conger in 1881 patented and supposedly built a motor that ran on compressed air or steam using a flexible tubing which will form a wedge-shaped or inclined wall or abutment in the rear of the tangential bearing of the wheel, and propel it with greater or less speed according to the pressure of the propelling medium.

== See also ==
- Angelo Di Pietro (inventor)
- Compressed-air energy storage
- Compressor
- Proe's Ericsson cycle engine; a variation of a compressed-air motor that uses a fuel to compress the air which is then immediately injected to the motor
- Chicago Pneumatic
- Simon Ingersoll
- Atlas Copco
