= Compressed air =

Air under a pressure greater than atmospheric

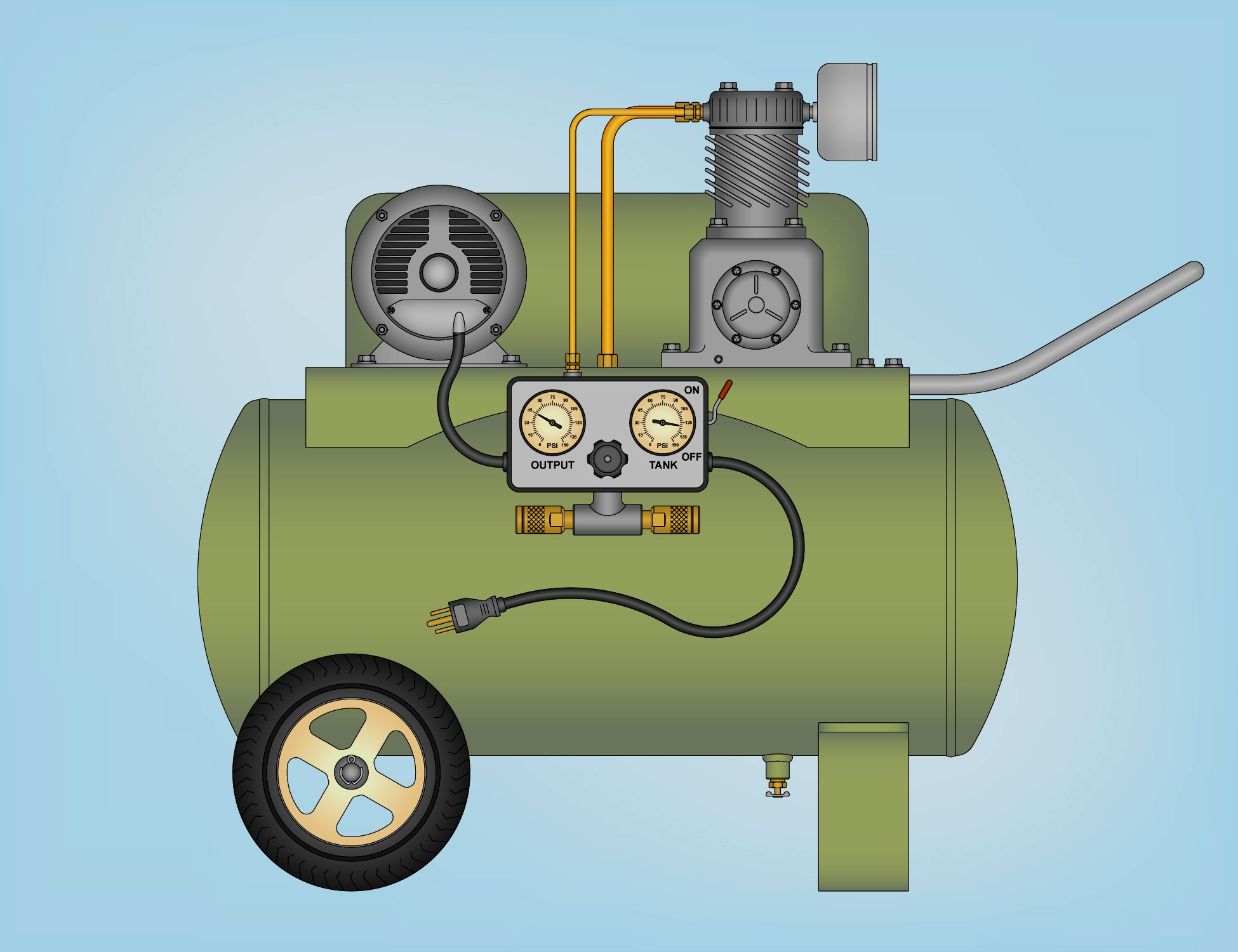
Technical illustration of portable single-stage air compressor

Compressed air is air kept under a pressure that is greater than atmospheric pressure. Compressed air in vehicle tires and shock absorbers are commonly used for improved traction and reduced vibration. Compressed air is an important medium for the transfer of energy in industrial processes and is used for power tools such as air hammers, drills, wrenches, and others, as well as to atomize paint, to operate air cylinders for automation, and can also be used to propel vehicles. Brakes applied by compressed air made large railway trains safer and more efficient to operate. Compressed air brakes are also found on large highway vehicles.

Compressed air is used as a breathing gas by underwater divers. The diver may carry it in a high-pressure diving cylinder, or supplied from the surface at lower pressure through an air line or diver's umbilical. Similar arrangements are used in breathing apparatus used by firefighters, mine rescue workers and industrial workers in hazardous atmospheres.

In Europe, 10 percent of all industrial electricity consumption is to produce compressed air—amounting to 80 terawatt hours consumption per year.

Industrial use of piped compressed air for power transmission was developed in the mid-19th century; unlike steam, compressed air could be piped for long distances without losing pressure due to condensation. An early major application of compressed air was in the drilling of the Mont Cenis Tunnel in Italy and France in 1861, where a 600 kPa (87 psi) compressed air plant provided power to pneumatic drills, increasing productivity greatly over previous manual drilling methods. Compressed-air drills were applied at mines in the United States in the 1870s. George Westinghouse invented air brakes for trains starting in 1869; these brakes considerably improved the safety of rail operations. In the 19th century, Paris had a system of pipes installed for municipal distribution of compressed air to power machines and to operate generators for lighting. Early air compressors were steam-driven, but in certain locations a trompe could directly obtain compressed air from the force of falling water.

== Breathing ==
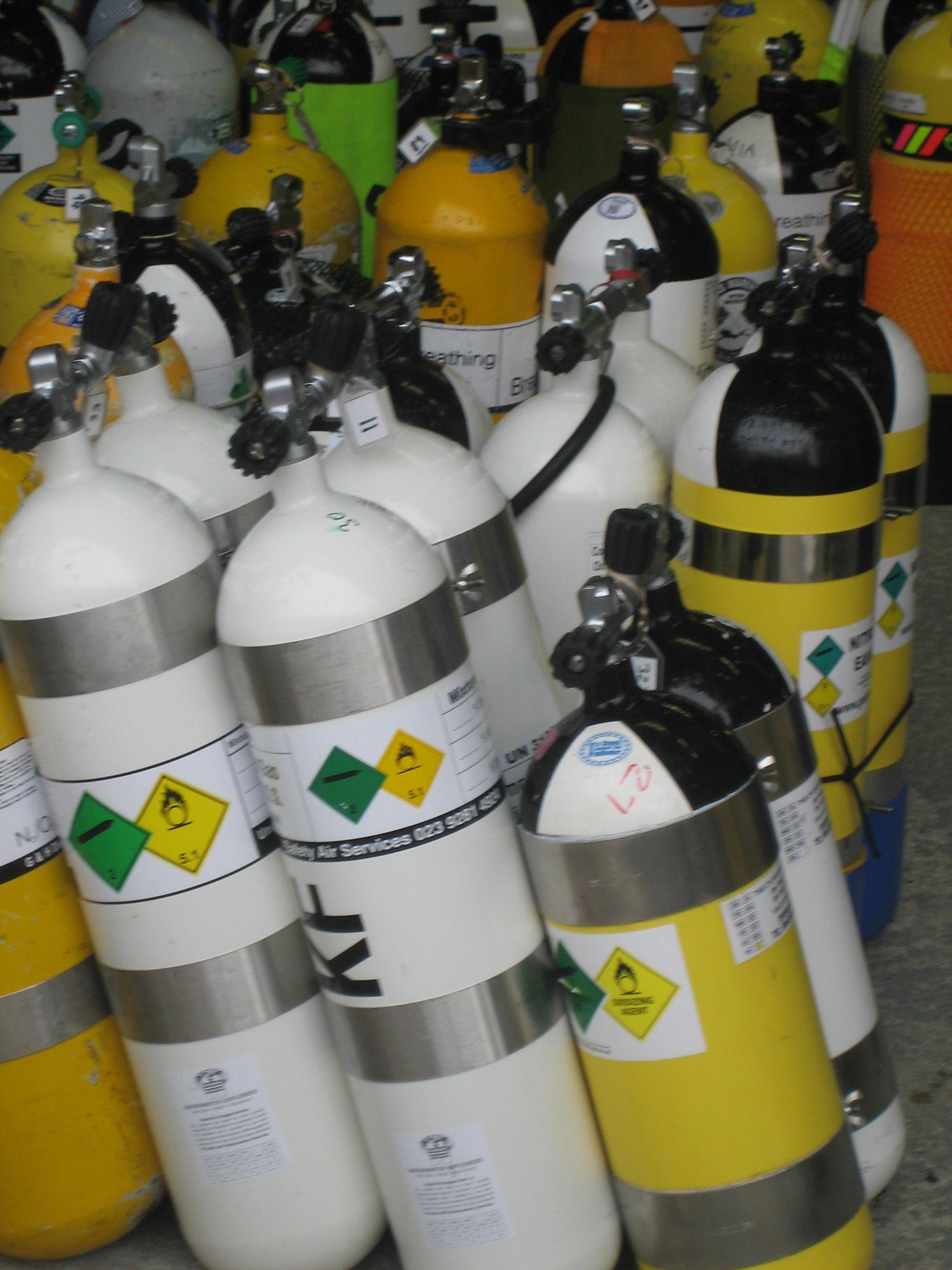
Diving cylinders used to store compressed air or other breathing gasses for underwater diving

Air for breathing may be stored at high pressure and gradually released when needed, as in scuba diving and self-contained breathing apparatus (SCBA) or used by firefighters and industrial workers, or produced continuously to meet requirements, as in surface-supplied diving. Air for breathing must be free of oil and other contaminants; carbon monoxide, for example, in trace volumetric fractions that might not be dangerous at normal atmospheric pressure may have deadly effects when breathing pressurized air due to proportionally higher partial pressure. Air compressors, filters, and supply systems intended for breathing air are not generally also used for pneumatic tools or other purposes, as air quality requirements differ.

Workers constructing the foundations of bridges or other structures may be working in a pressurized enclosure called a caisson, where water is prevented from entering the open bottom of the enclosure by filling it with air under pressure. It was known as early as the 17th century that workers in diving bells experienced shortness of breath and risked asphyxia, relieved by the release of fresh air into the bell. Such workers also experienced pain and other symptoms when returning to the surface, as the pressure was relieved. Denis Papin suggested in 1691 that the working time in a diving bell could be extended if fresh air from the surface was continually forced under pressure into the bell. By the 19th century, caissons were regularly used in civil construction, but workers experienced serious, sometimes fatal, symptoms on returning to the surface, a syndrome called caisson disease or decompression sickness. Many workers were killed by the disease on projects such as the Brooklyn Bridge and the Eads Bridge and it was not until the 1890s that it was understood that workers had to decompress slowly, to prevent the formation of dangerous bubbles in tissues.

Air under moderately high pressure, such as is used when diving below about 20 metres (70 ft), has an increasing narcotic effect on the nervous system. Nitrogen narcosis is a hazard when diving. For diving much beyond 30 metres (100 ft), it is less safe to use air alone and special breathing mixes containing helium are often used.

In land-based applications, SCBAs, UEBSS (USA), and EBBS (EU) provide breathable air for emergency responders, industrial workers, and military personnel in hazardous environments. These devices use compressed air cylinders to supply clean air to the wearer, ensuring safety in oxygen-deficient or contaminated atmospheres. To enhance operational safety and efficiency, Kee Connections Buddy Breather coupling allows users to share air in emergency situations. This coupling system enables firefighters or other SCBA users to connect their breathing apparatuses, providing life-saving air support when needed. Such innovations help improve survivability and teamwork in high-risk conditions.

== Uses ==
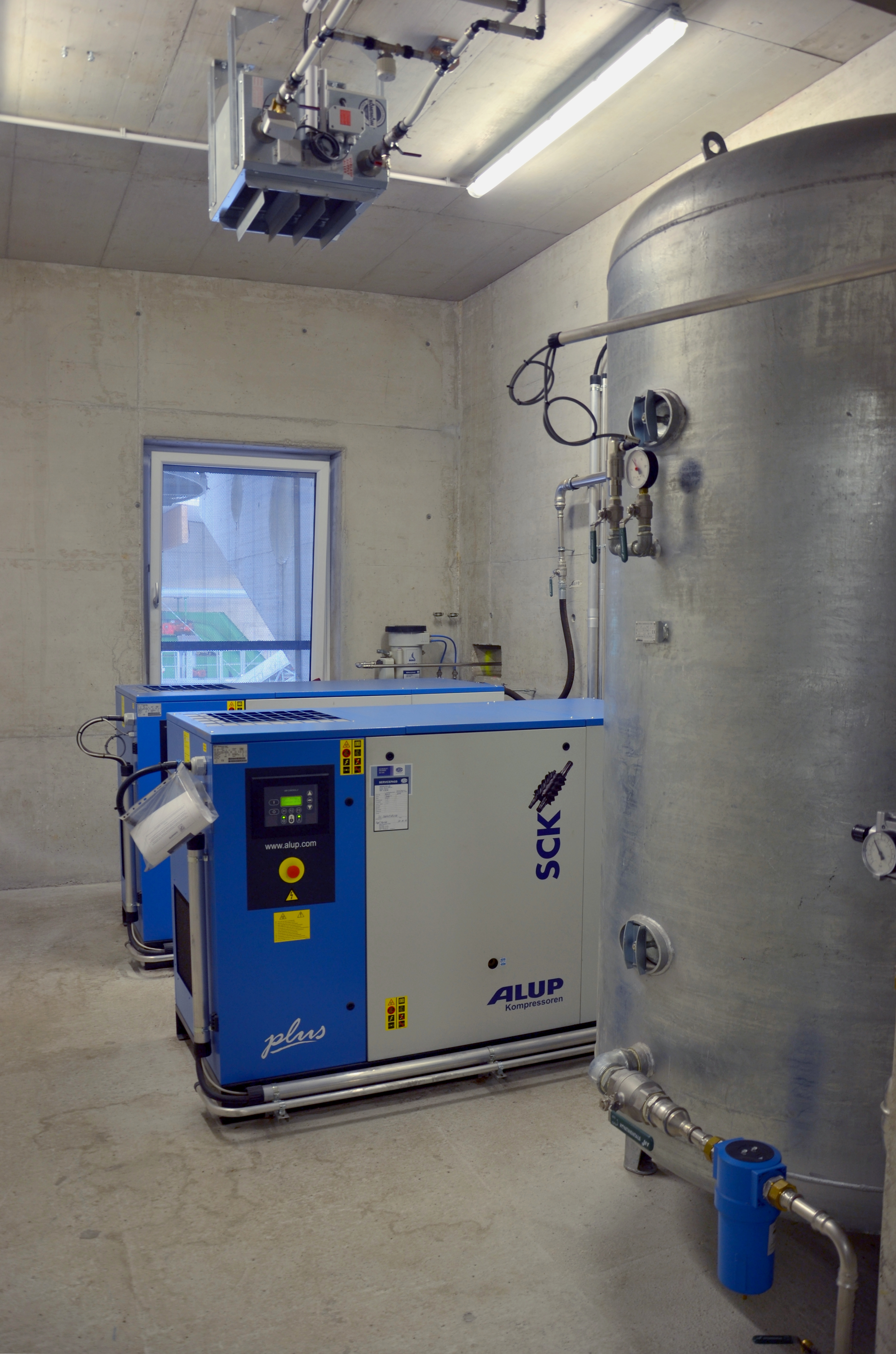
Air compressor station in a power plant

In industry, compressed air is so widely used that it is often regarded as the fourth utility, after electricity, natural gas and water. However, compressed air is more expensive than the other three utilities when evaluated on a per unit energy delivered basis.

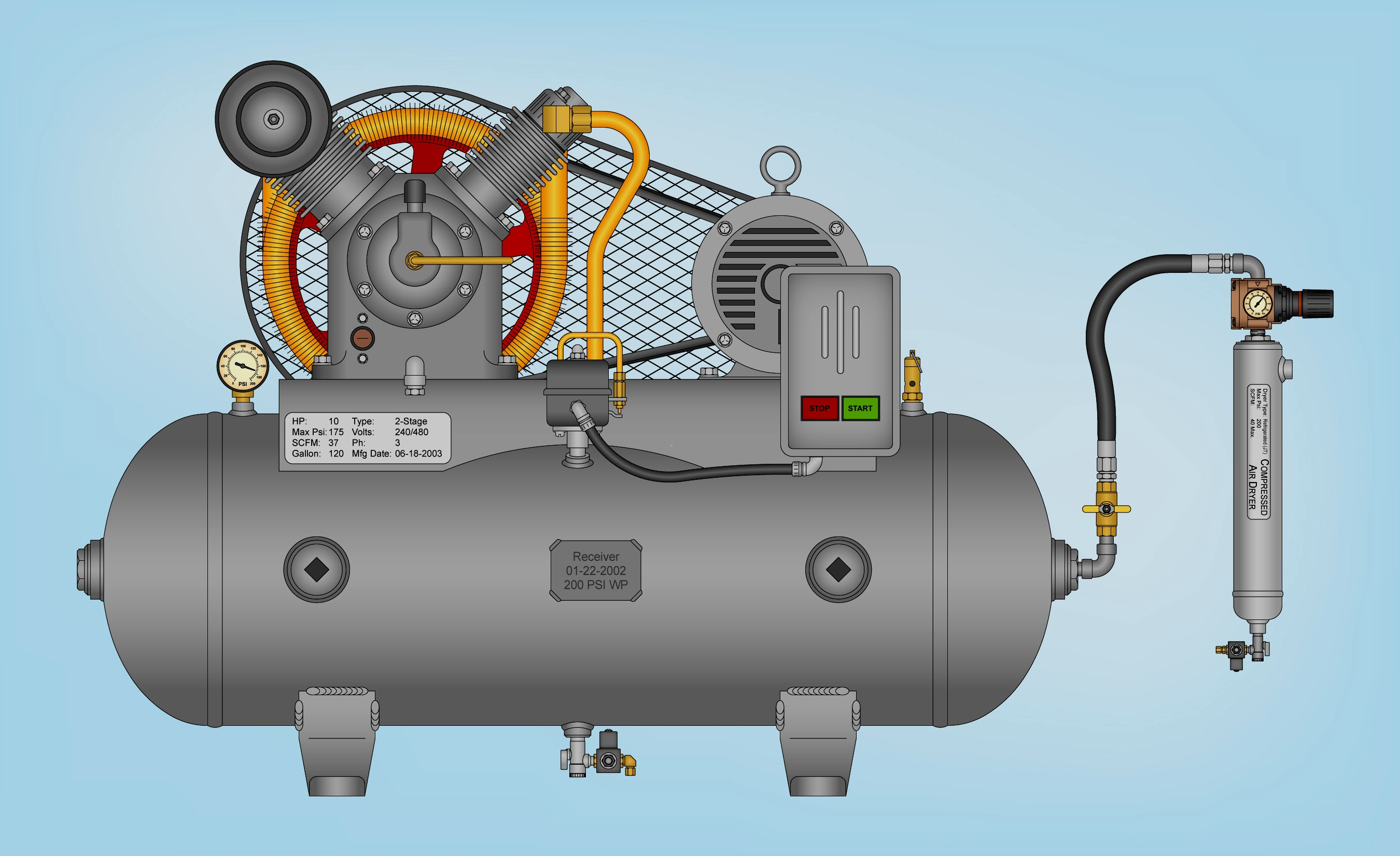
Two-stage air compressor assembled on a horizontal tank and equipped with a Joule-Thomson (JT) type refrigerated compressed air dryer

Compressed air is used for many purposes, including:

- Pneumatics, the use of pressurized gases to do work
  - Pneumatic post, using capsules to move paper and small goods through tubes.
  - Air tools
  - HVAC control systems
  - Spray painting
- Vehicle propulsion (see compressed-air vehicle)
- Energy storage (see compressed-air energy storage)
- Recreation – Amusement Parks, Golf Courses (Sprinkler Systems), Hotel elevators, Ski Resorts (Snow making)
- Air brakes, including:
  - Railway braking systems
  - Road vehicle braking systems
- Underwater diving, for breathing, to inflate buoyancy compensator devices and lifting bags, and for airlift dredging
- Refrigeration using a vortex tube
- Air-start systems in engines
- Ammunition propulsion in:
  - Air guns
  - Airsoft equipment
  - Paintball equipment
- Cleaning dust and small debris in tiny spaces
- Abrasive blasting for removing corrosion products and coatings
- Injection molding
- Airbrushing used by model railroaders and other hobbyists to paint and weather cars, boats, planes and trains
- Food and beverage capping and fermentation
- Compressed air from Lysefjorden/Preikestolen (Norway) is being sold in cans, mostly to China.

=== Emergency services and firefighting ===
- Self-Contained Breathing Apparatus (SCBA) – Used by firefighters, rescue workers, and hazmat teams for breathing in hazardous environments.
- Fire suppression systems – Some fire suppression systems, such as dry chemical and CO_{2} systems, use compressed air to discharge fire-extinguishing agents.
- Pneumatic rescue tools (jaws of life) – Hydraulic or pneumatic-powered rescue tools used to cut through vehicles and debris during emergency extrications.
- Inflatable Rescue Devices – Air-powered inflatable boats, flotation devices, and emergency life rafts.

=== Medical ===
- Ventilators and respirators – Compressed air is used in hospitals and ambulances to power ventilators and oxygen delivery systems.
- Dental equipment – Dentists use compressed air to power drills and cleaning tools
- Hyperbaric chambers – Used for treating decompression sickness, wound healing, and other medical conditions requiring high-pressure oxygen therapy.
- Portable oxygen systems – Some emergency and home healthcare oxygen systems use compressed air for efficient delivery.

== Energy Costs of a Compressed Air System ==
Regarding operating costs, it is important to consider that compressed air represents a significant portion of total energy costs. Roughly, every 1 kW of power produced requires 8 kW of electrical power. Additionally, considering the lifecycle of a compressed air system (about 10–15 years), the total costs can be broken down as follows:

- 70–75%: Energy costs
- 15–20%: Compressor, accessories, piping, and installation costs
- 10%: Maintenance costs

== Design of systems ==
Compressor rooms must be designed with ventilation systems to remove waste heat produced by the compressors.

=== Water and oil vapor removal ===
When air at atmospheric pressure is compressed, it contains much more water vapor than the high-pressure air can hold. Relative humidity is governed by the properties of water and is not affected by air pressure. After compressed air cools, then the vaporized water turns to liquefied water.

Cooling the air as it leaves the compressor will take most of the moisture out before it gets into the piping. Aftercooler, storage tanks, etc. can help the compressed air cool to 40 °C (104 °F); two-thirds of the water then turns to liquid.

Management of the excessive moisture is a requirement of a compressed air distribution system. System designers must ensure that piping maintains a slope, to prevent accumulation of moisture in low parts of the piping system. Drain valves may be installed at multiple points of a large system to allow trapped water to be blown out. Taps from piping headers may be arranged at the tops of pipes, so that moisture is not carried over into piping branches feeding equipment. Piping sizes are selected to avoid excessive energy loss in the piping system due to excess velocity in straight pipes at times of peak demand, or due to turbulence at pipe fittings.

== See also ==
- Air compressor – Machine to pressurize air
- Cabin pressurization – Process to maintain internal air pressure in aircraft or spacecraft
- Compressed air dryer – Filter systems to reduce humidity of compressed air
- Compressor – Machine to increase pressure of gas by reducing its volume
- Gas duster – Product used for dusting devices – (generally use fluorocarbons but some use compressed air.)
- Rotary-screw compressor – Gas compressor using a rotary positive-displacement mechanism
- Air-line fitting – Operation and styles of various international fittings
