= History of Formula One regulations =

The regulations governing Formula One, set by the sport's governing body, the FIA, have changed many times throughout the history of the sport. The primary reason behind rule changes has traditionally been safety. As each decade has passed, the FIA has made more and more changes in the regulations so that better facilities and equipment are available in the event of an accident at race meetings. These rule changes have also been aimed at eliminating dangerous practices from the sport in an effort to make it safer.

Many innovations and technological improvements have been banned over the years as a result of FIA regulation changes. The governing body has taken these actions to slow the cars down to a level where they can be driven relatively safely; if cornering speeds were sufficiently high, an accident while cornering would almost certainly result in the death of the driver.

Since 2000, the FIA has been issuing an increasing number of rule changes to limit the cost of Formula One, which has increased dramatically and to an unsustainable degree in recent years. From 2009 onwards, the sport has committed itself to dramatic reductions in expenditure.

== 1950s ==
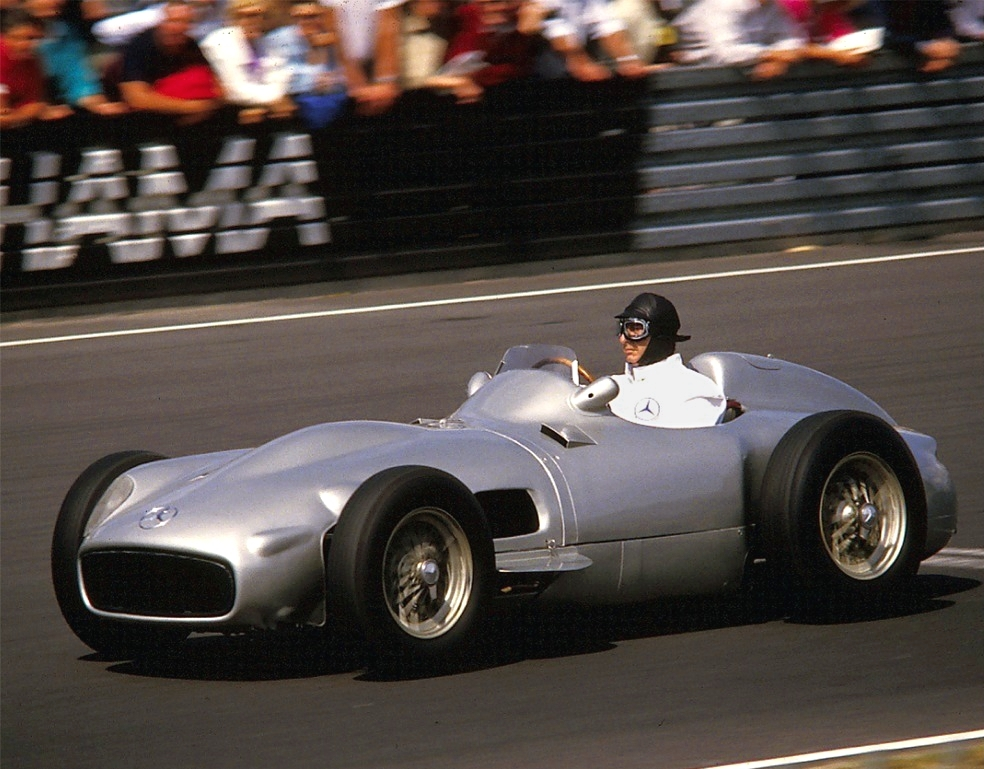
Five times World Champion Juan-Manuel Fangio driving a Mercedes-Benz W196 (from 1954 to 1955) in 1986.

Although Formula One races had been taking place since 1946, it was not until 1950 that the World Championship was established. Safety was almost a non-issue in the first 10 years of racing, and technological progress was extremely slow compared to modern standards. All of the circuits that Formula One raced on in the 1950s had no safety features; the general mentality was that death was an acceptable risk, and as a result, very few regulations were changed during this period.

1948–1953
Maximum engine displacement set to 1500 cc for engines with a compressor (supercharger or turbocharger), or 4500 cc for naturally aspirated engines. No weight limit. For 1952, crash helmets are made compulsory, but these helmets are made with dubious materials and resemble medium-sized dinner bowls. Note that in 1952 and 1953, the World Drivers' Championship was run to Formula Two regulations (maximum capacity of 750 cc for supercharged engines or 2000 cc for naturally aspirated engines), but the Formula One regulations remained unchanged, and numerous non-championship Formula One races were held during this period.
1954
Maximum engine displacement amended to 750 cc with a compressor, or 2500 cc with natural aspiration. No weight limit.
1958
The use of commercial petrol becomes compulsory, and alcohol-based racing fuels are banned.

== 1960s ==
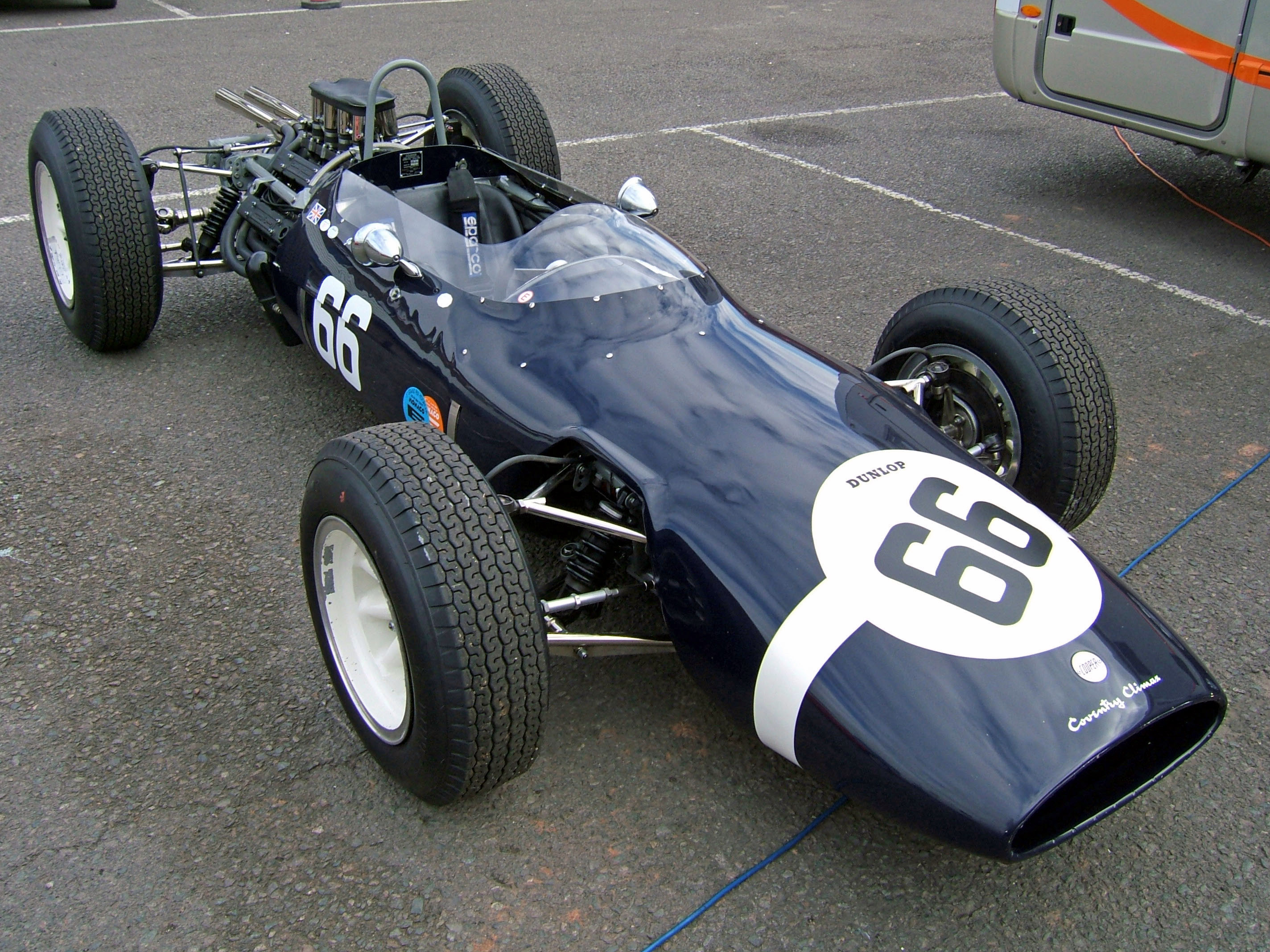
The Cooper T66 which raced during the 1963 and 1964 seasons.

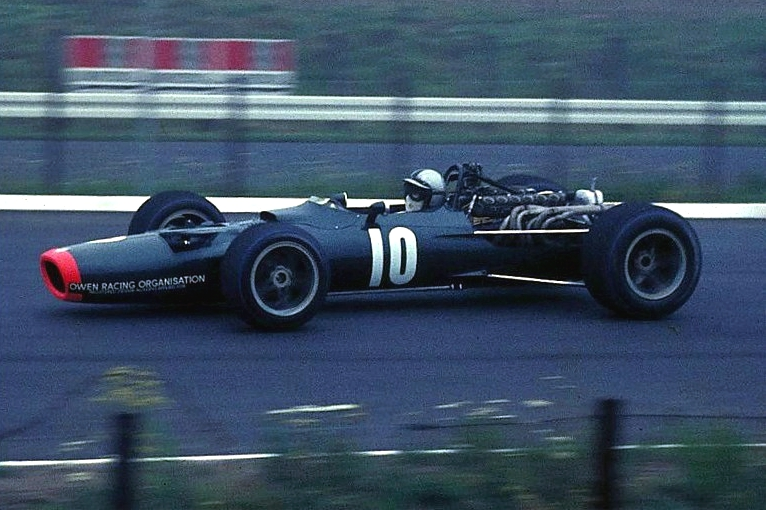
Mexico's Pedro Rodríguez driving the BRM P133 in 1968.

The 1960s began the way the previous decade had ended for Formula One's rule book, with relatively few changes made. However, with the advent of a new breed of innovative and forward-thinking designers like Colin Chapman and the beginnings of drivers lobbying for safer racing conditions, the number of rule changes made began to accelerate as the decade came to a close.

1960
Regulations unchanged from 1959 (maximum engine displacement of 750 cc with a compressor or 2500 cc with natural aspiration, no weight restrictions).
1961–1965
Engine specs amended to a naturally aspirated engine of between 1300 cc and 1500 cc (no compressors allowed), minimum weight set to 450 kg (990 lb), open wheels mandated, pump fuel only, required automatic starter, roll bar, double braking system, standardised seatbelt anchorage, and fire protection for fuel tanks, fillers and breathers. FIA begins to organise safety inspections (previously done by local authorities), protective helmet and overalls obligatory, flag signalling code established.
1966–1969
Engine specs amended to allow a 1500 cc engine with a compressor or a 3000 cc naturally aspirated engine, minimum weight increased to 500 kg (1,100 lb), required electrical circuit breaker, reverse gear, oil catch tank, roll bar 5 cm above driver's head, two-part extinguisher system, and cockpit designed for quick evacuation. All aerodynamic features must be immobile (thereby banning air brakes) and fixed to a sprung part of the car, maximum bodywork height and width restrictions ban the use of dangerous high wings, and recommendations are made on seat harnesses, fire-resistant clothing and shatterproof visors.: Straw bales banned from use as safety barriers in response to Lorenzo Bandini's fatal accident in Monaco in 1967.

== 1970s ==
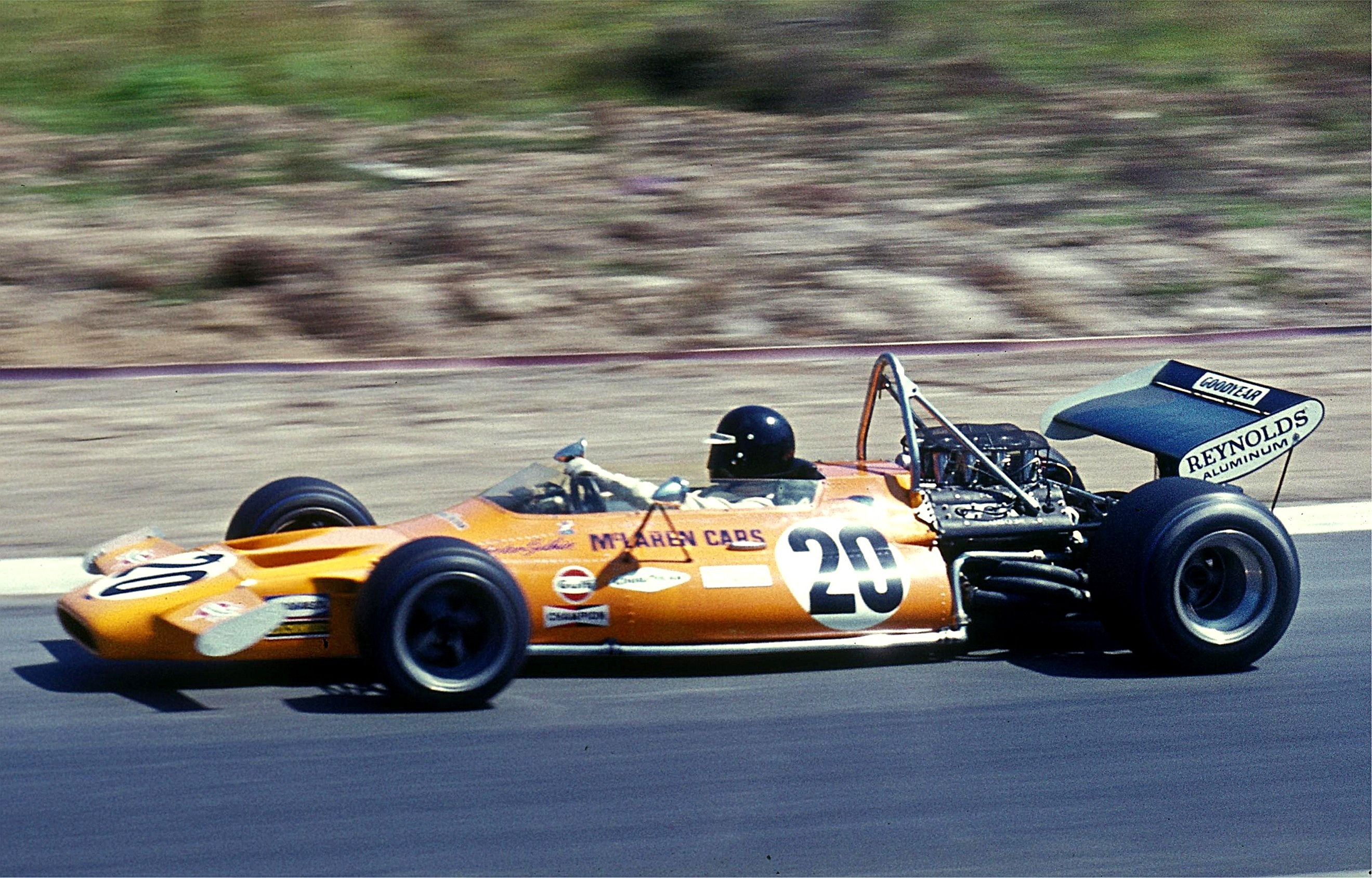
Peter Gethin driving the 1971 McLaren M19A.

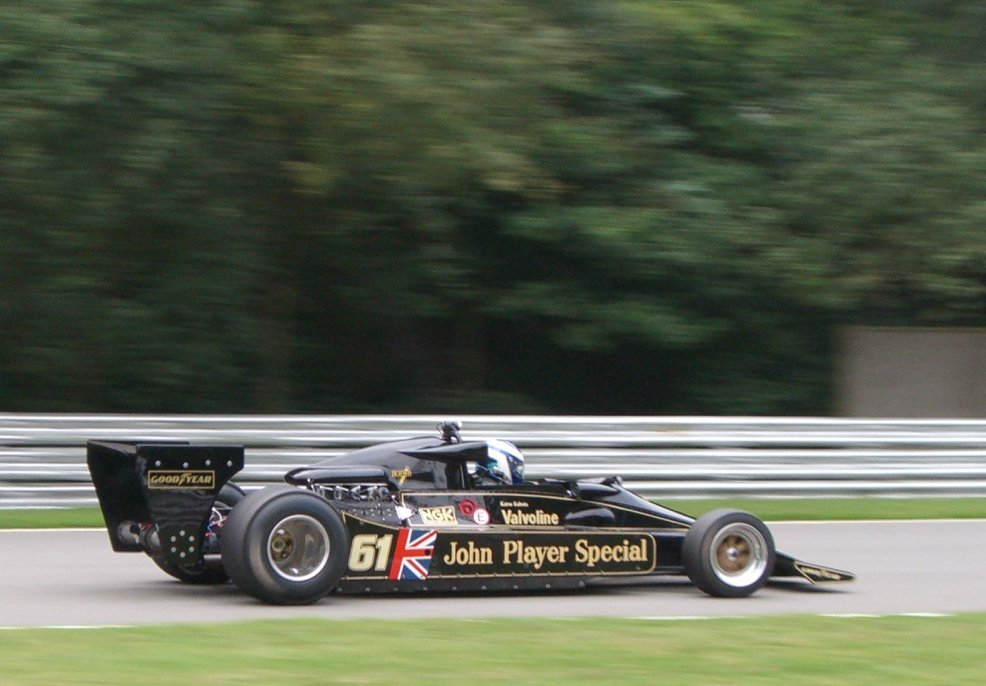
The 'ground effect' Lotus 78 pictured in 1977.

The speed of Formula One cars had increased dramatically since 1950, but the standard of safety at race meetings had not followed suit. Deaths were still common, with many factors to blame. Many of the drivers felt that the danger level involved in the sport was still unnecessarily high despite the changes in the rules that had been implemented by the end of the 1960s. The drivers' crusade for improved safety was led in the 1970s by Jackie Stewart. After the needless and avoidable death of Ronnie Peterson at the Italian Grand Prix in 1978, the sport finally made the wholesale changes needed to bring it up towards the modern standards of safety which it enjoys today.

The 1970s was the last decade that Formula One raced at truly long circuits (i.e. with lap times close to or over 3 minutes); going into the decade, Formula One still raced at the 5-mile Charade circuit, the 8.7-mile Spa-Francorchamps circuit, and the 14.2-mile Nürburgring Nordschleife. Although the aforementioned circuits were improved with safety features, all three had disappeared from the calendar by 1977 for the same general reason—safety concerns. Safer circuits such as Paul Ricard, Zolder, and Hockenheimring were built with safety features installed, and at the end of the decade Formula One had become a safer sport, although it was still dangerous.

Ground effect, a technology that was able to create huge amounts of downforce with inverted aerofoils mounted on the sides of the car, was discovered and developed by Colin Chapman and his Lotus team in the mid 70s, and the technology was perfected with the dominant Type 79. All the other teams followed suit, and the performance of the cars skyrocketed over a period of 2 years.

1970
Minimum weight increased to 530 kg (1,170 lb), safety bladder fuel cell tanks introduced. Report published on track standards recommending banning of straw bales, installation of double guard rails, 3-metre grass verges, spectators to be kept a minimum of 3 metres behind guard railings, barrier between pit lane and track as well as track width, surface and gradient recommendations, and mandatory FIA inspections of track facilities.
1971
Role responsibilities and mandatory equipment list set out for race supervisors, marshals, and signalers. Drivers must be able to evacuate from their cockpits in less than five seconds. All race distances must be under 200 miles (320 km).
1972
Minimum weight increased to 550 kg (1,210 lb), safety foam in fuel tanks, no magnesium sheeting to be less than 3 mm thick, a 15w red rear light, on the centre-line, mounted as high as possible, became mandatory, head rest required, minimum cockpit dimensions established, combined electrical cutoff and extinguisher external handle required, fuel tanks to meet FIA specifications, six-point harness required, circuit safety criteria established, driver's code of conduct released.
The first appearance of the red taillight for all Formulae, was not for any one specific reason, but instead was to be switched on by order of the clerk of the course.
1973
Numbers now assigned to drivers; the #1 number is assigned to the reigning World Champion. Minimum weight increased to 575 kg (1,268 lb), mandatory crushable structure around fuel tanks, no chrome plating of suspension parts allowed (to avoid hydrogen embrittlement), drivers required to carry medical card and submit to medical examination before they are able to race, catch fencing and rescue equipment mandatory at races, starting grid dimensions standardised, fire service regulations established.
1974
Self-sealing fuel lines mandatory, sand traps added alongside catch fencing as safety features at circuits, 2x2 staggered starting grid with 12 metres allowed per car.
1975
Marshal's posts to be provided with service roads for ease of access, FIA standard set for fire resistant clothing.
1976
Overhead airboxes banned, and the cooling of engines through similar means is heavily limited. "Safety structures" around dashboard and pedals implemented. After Niki Lauda's near-fatal accident at a nearly inaccessible point on the treacherous 14.2 mi (22.8 km) Nürburgring in West Germany, the circuit was taken off the 1977 calendar after having been on the calendar for all but 4 seasons of Formula One up to 1976.
1977
Pedal box safety structures and gravel traps more adequately defined, helmets must be made to FIA approved standards.
1978
Brabham's BT46B 'fan car' deemed illegal and banned after its first (and only) appearance of the season, where it won at the Swedish Grand Prix. Bulkhead behind driver and front roll bar defined, licence qualification criteria set for all drivers, all grid slots allocated 14 metres per car.: Following a request from Lotus, a single central fuel tank between the driver and engine is permitted. Previously, no more than 80 litres of fuel in a single tank was allowed, meaning most cars required 3 separate fuel tanks (usually a bladder on each side of the cockpit, and another tank behind it). However, this requires multiple fuel lines for the various tanks, and it is the shearing of the fuel lines in impacts that causes the fires of Jo Siffert, Roger Williamson, and Niki Lauda. Therefore, the central tank pioneered by Lotus becomes accepted as a safer option to stop fuel lines being sheared from side impacts and igniting.
1979
Medical air required to be piped into driver's helmet in the event of an accident. Larger cockpit opening, two mirrors, improved onboard fire extinguisher, and FIA-appointed permanent race starter mandatory.

== 1980s ==
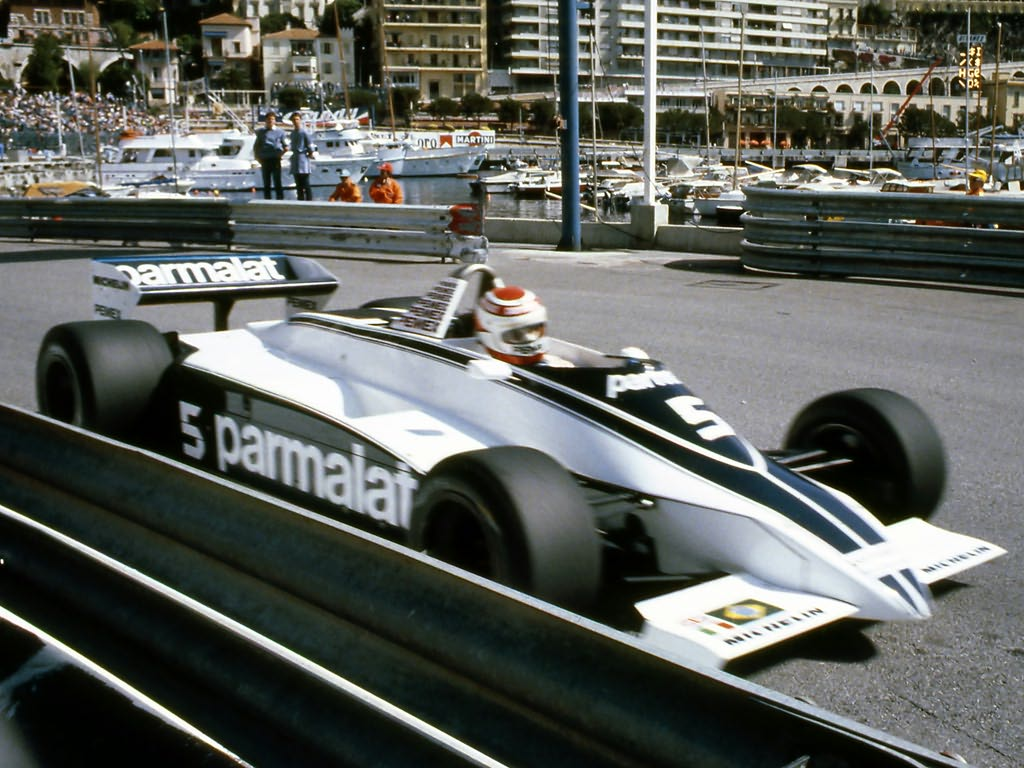
1981 World Champion Nelson Piquet at that season's race at Monaco in his ground-effect Brabham BT49C.

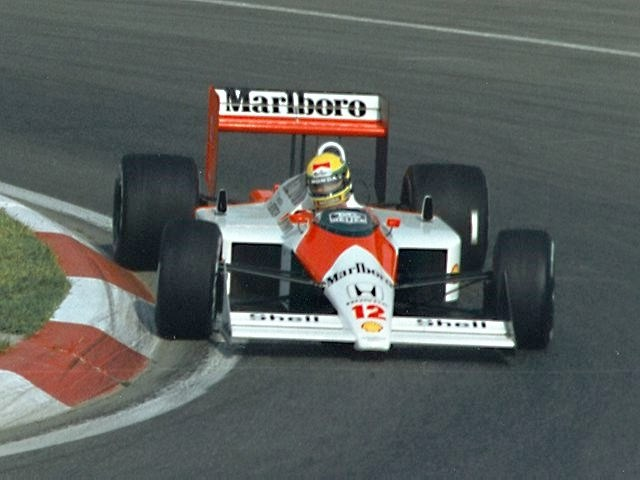
Eventual triple World Champion Ayrton Senna at the 1988 Canadian Grand Prix in his McLaren MP4/4, powered by a Honda turbocharged engine.

With the raft of safety improvements as a result of Ronnie Peterson's fatal crash being implemented during the late 70s and early 80s, Formula One overall became much safer despite the deaths of Patrick Depailler in 1980 and Gilles Villeneuve & Riccardo Paletti in 1982. The huge amounts of downforce created by ground effect became increasingly dangerous as years went on, and aside from the fatal accidents mentioned above, a number of drivers crashed heavily enough for their careers to be brought to an end, and the technology was banned outright at the start of the 1983 season. These safety changes, coupled with the much stronger carbon fibre replacing aluminium as the material of choice for chassis construction, meant there was not a single driver fatality at a race meeting for the rest of the decade.

However, one factor threatening to undo all this progress was the almost exponentially increasing power being extracted from turbocharged engines. Renault proved in 1980 that turbocharging was the way forward, with their very dominant performances in qualifying in almost every race (especially on fast and high-altitude circuits, where the thinner air did not affect the turbocharged engines). With power outputs doubling in less than 10 years and figures in excess of 1,400 bhp (1,000 kW; 1,400 PS) floated by engine manufacturers, the FIA's primary goal from 1986 onwards became to rein in turbo engines before finally banning them altogether at the end of the 1988 season.

Brabham team owner Bernie Ecclestone and ex-March team owner Max Mosley set new organizational standards for Formula One, something they had been working on since 1972. All races became organized by Formula One Management instead of circuit organizers; the organization also set specific times for races, practice sessions, and qualifying sessions, and teams were made to commit to all races in a season to assure sponsors that their advertising would be seen on television—also an enterprise set up by Ecclestone and Mosley. This effectively transformed the sport into the multibillion-dollar business it is today.

1980
Permanent medical facility staffed by FIA-approved medics required at all tracks. Fast response car mandatory at all races, minimum car weight remains at 575 kg (1,268 lb).
1981
Formula One World Championship officially established by Formula One Management, an organization headed by Britons Bernie Ecclestone and Max Mosley. Through the teams' and the FIA's signing of the 1st Concorde Agreement concocted by Ecclestone and Mosley, new standards are set, such as no more sequences of races being run over a period of seven months, and practice and qualifying sessions and races being started at official times. The series is now an official business operating by its own standards while adhering to regulations set by the FIA; all circuit organizers must comply to these standards and regulations. This includes the banning of private entries of other makes of car; any team entering any official championship Formula One race must enter their own cars, and all teams have to commit to the number of races scheduled each season. Although the teams have to make their own cars, they are still allowed to purchase engines and gearboxes from independent manufacturers.: Flexible side skirts banned to reduce downforce created by ground effect, mandatory ground clearance of 6 cm required to limit ground effect further, twin-chassis Lotus 88 outlawed, pit lane minimum width set to 10 metres, survival cell extending to the front of the driver's feet introduced to improve driver survivability in the event of an accident, minimum weight of car increased to 585 kg (1,290 lb).
1982
Rotary, diesel, gas turbine, and Sarich orbital engines all banned as part of the Concorde Agreement. Rigid skirts legalised and ride height restrictions removed, as FIA admits that policing a ban is not possible whilst many teams are using hydraulic suspension systems to alter ride heights and circumvent the rules. Minimum weight reduced to 580 kg.
1983
Ground effect undertrays outlawed completely for the beginning of the 1983 season; all cars return to a flat undertray. Four-wheel drive banned, along with cars with more than four wheels, minimum weight reduced to 540 kg (1,190 lb).
1984
In-race refuelling banned, fuel tank required to be in centre of car between driver and engine, maximum fuel capacity set to 220 litres per race to try and reduce the output of turbo engines, drivers required to have FIA Super Licence to compete in F1, concrete retaining walls permitted alongside guard rails.
1985
Rear wing size limits set. All cars now subject to a frontal crash test to be deemed race worthy.
1986
Catch fencing banned and permanent FIA medical service inspector and medevac helicopter mandatory at race meetings after needless death of Elio de Angelis in testing. All F1 test sessions to be completed under full race meeting safety conditions, engine displacement set to 1500 cc with compressor (i.e. naturally aspirated engines prohibited), maximum fuel capacity reduced to 195 litres per race.
1987
Boost pressure capped at 4.0 bar to limit turbo power, minimum weight reduced to 500 kg (1,100 lb). Naturally aspirated engines reallowed with a maximum capacity of 3500 cc and no fuel limit. Grid slots allocated 16 metres per car. FIA announce that from 1989 onwards turbos will be banned, and to encourage teams to switch, two additional championships are introduced, which are open to non-turbo teams only: the Jim Clark Cup for drivers and the Colin Chapman Trophy for constructors. These one-off championships are won by Jonathan Palmer and Tyrrell-Ford respectively.
1988
Maximum boost pressure further reduced to 2.5 bar to limit power output of turbo engines in their final year (until 2014), maximum fuel capacity of turbo cars reduced to 150 litres per race. In any design, the driver's feet must not extend beyond the front wheel axle, static crash test of survival cell and fuel cell mandatory, minimum weight increased to 540 kg (1,190 lb).
1989
Turbocharged engines banned completely, with only naturally aspirated engines of 3500 cc in size and 8 to 12 cylinders permitted. Overhead air intakes reallowed, fuel restrictions removed. All trackside guard rails must be a minimum of 1 metre in height, and the pit wall must be a minimum of 1 m 35 cm in height. All drivers subject to anti-doping testing as per IOC guidelines.

== 1990s ==
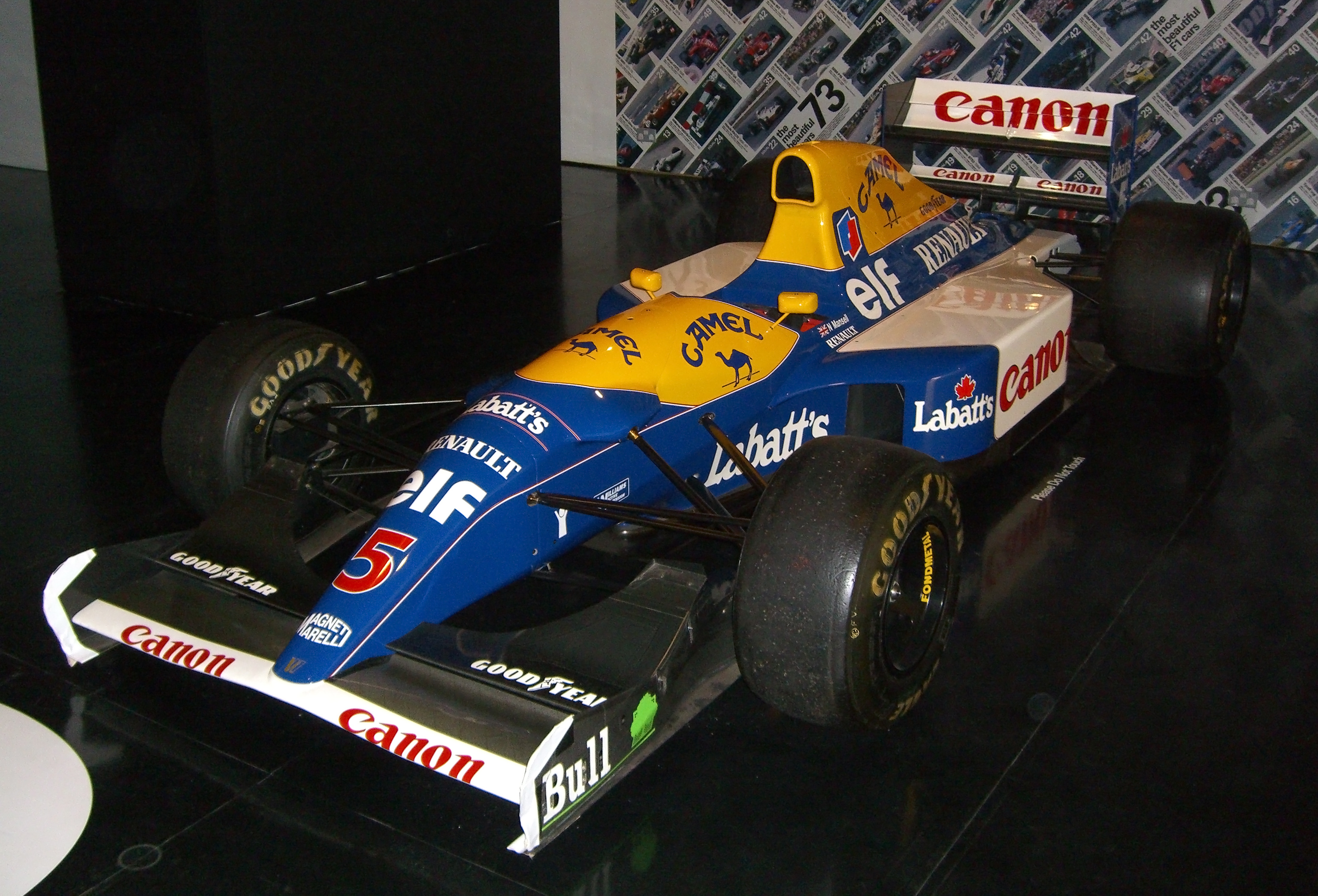
The 1992 Williams FW14B was one of the most technologically advanced Formula One cars of all time.

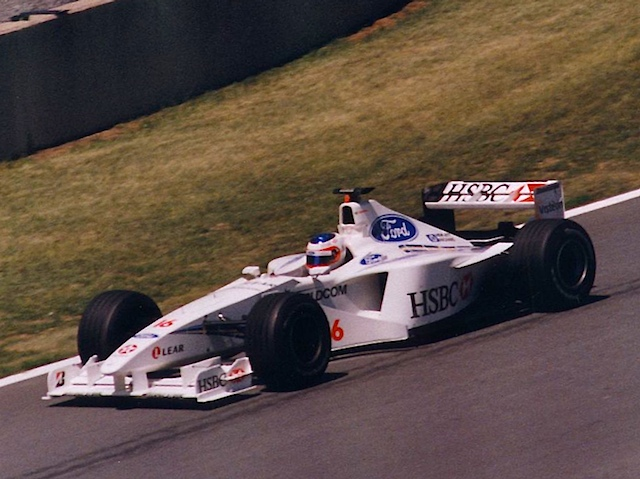
Rubens Barrichello driving for the short lived but successful Stewart Grand Prix team.

Despite several near misses (particularly during the turbo era), Formula One had managed to go almost 12 whole years without a single fatality at a race meeting. The strength of the carbon fibre chassis being used and the fortunate escapes of many drivers involved in high-speed accidents during this period made many inside the sport believe that death was a thing of the past in Formula One. This attitude was made to look foolish when the FIA hastily banned virtually all of the performance enhancing electronic technology that the teams had become dependent on for the start of the 1994 season, making many of that year's cars nervy and edgy to drive. With more power than in 1993 but less stability, some observers at the time (most notably Ayrton Senna) stated that they believed 1994 would "be a season with lots of accidents".

The near-fatal accidents of JJ Lehto and Jean Alesi during pre-season and in-season testing were both to prove Senna right. This was climaxed by the catastrophic 1994 San Marino Grand Prix, with Brazilian Rubens Barrichello being severely injured during a heavy crash in a Friday practice session. This set the stage for the disastrous events of the rest of the weekend, which led to the deaths of Austrian driver Roland Ratzenberger and Senna himself; all three accidents on consecutive days. The sweeping changes that the FIA implemented post-Imola proved to be almost as rash as the ones at the end of 1993 and nearly claimed the life of Pedro Lamy in a testing accident. The cause of Lamy's accident was cited as rear wing failure—the result of the FIA rushing through new rules, including one reducing the size of the rear diffuser and by extension the number of anchoring points the attached rear wing assembly could use.

To its credit, the FIA learned from the mistakes of 1994, and much more consideration and forward thinking was put into rule changes from then onwards. By the close of the decade, a measure of the impact on the sport that the 1994 San Marino Grand Prix has had was that for the first time in its history, safety had become Formula One's number one concern.

1990
Larger mirrors and quick-release steering wheel made mandatory, all marshals and medical staff must practice driver extrication exercises.
1991
Front wing narrowed from 150 cm (59 in) to 140 cm (55 in). Rear overhang reduced from 60 cm (24 in) to 50 cm (20 in). More stringent testing of survival cell by FIA, including seat belts, fuel tanks, and roll bar. Points scoring system overhauled; a win now secures 10 points, and all results count instead of just the best 11 scores.
1992
More exhaustive testing of survival cell, including rear impact testing. Height of kerbing lowered, minimum width of pit lane increased to 12 m (39 ft), pit lane entry chicane mandatory, safety car introduced.
1993
Rear tyre width reduced from 18 inches (457 mm) to 15 inches (381 mm) to reduce grip and thus speed of cars, overall car width reduced from 220 cm to 200 cm, rear wing height reduced from 100 cm to 90 cm, distance of front end plates from flat bottom increased from 25 to 40 mm (0.98 to 1.57 in), head rest area increased from 80 to 400 cm^{2} (12 to 62 in^{2}). Continuously variable transmissions (CVTs) banned before ever appearing at a race. End-of-race crowd control measures implemented, 50 km/h pit lane speed restriction during free practice. Fuel used restricted to that available to the general public. Drivers limited to 12 laps each in both qualifying sessions; maximum number of cars on the grid set to 25 cars (later increased to 26 from German Grand Prix onwards).
1994
Ban on electronic driver aids such as active suspension, traction control, launch control, ABS, and (without ever appearing in a race) four-wheel steering at the beginning of the season, mid-race refuelling allowed for the first time since 1983, pit crews now required to wear fireproof racing suits in conjunction with return of refuelling. Parade lap to be completed behind safety car (abandoned from Imola onwards).: Post-Imola, sweeping changes introduced to slow cars down starting from Monaco onwards. Pit lane speed limit implemented; between the Spanish and German Grands Prix, additional changes are phased in and include a reduction in the height of the rear wing of 10 cm, an increase in the height of the front wing, no front wing trailing assemblies to extend behind the front wheels, a 10 mm wooden skid block fitted to the undertray (permitted to be worn by no more than 1 mm by the end of the race), a ban on high rear wing assemblies extending ahead of the rear axle line to sidestep wing height restrictions, engine airbox depressurised to reduce power, minimum headrest thickness of 75 mm (3.0 in) introduced, more stringent fire extinguisher regulations and driver helmet criteria implemented, pit lane speed restriction amended to 80 km/h (50 mph) in practice and 120 km/h (75 mph) in race conditions, pit spectator area to be shielded from fire. 27 corners on circuits identified as very high-risk; changes made to circuit layouts to remove or modify these parts of the tracks.
1995
Reduction in engine displacement from 3,500 to 3,000 cc (214 to 183 cu in) to further slow cars, longer and higher cockpit openings to reduce chance of impact with driver's head in the event of an accident, survival cell side impact tests introduced, obligatory automatic neutral selection upon engine stop, chassis length forward of driver's feet increased from 15 to 30 cm (5.9 to 11.8 in), frontal impact test speed increased from 11 m/s to 12 m/s, kerbs made smoother, pit wall debris shield installed, 3 inch safety straps mandatory, Super Licence criteria and fuel restrictions made more stringent (i.e. special racing fuels, previously an exotic mixture of benzenes and toluenes, are banned; only those with similar characteristics to everyday unleaded petrol are permitted).
1996
Increased cockpit protection around driver's head, front wing endplates to be no more than 10 mm thick to reduce damage to tyres of other cars in event of collision, all harness release levers must point downwards. To qualify for a race, all cars must now be within 107% of pole time, car numbers now allocated as per previous season's performance, Friday qualifying abandoned, number of free practice sessions increased from two to three, number of laps allocated each day increased from 23 to 30, standardisation of all FIA safety cars and medical cars, more fire drills for marshals, starting procedure improved, data storage unit to be mounted within survival cell.
1997
Test tracks now require FIA approval and supervision, kerbing standardised, bolted tyre wall construction obligatory, cars to carry FIA accident data recorder (ADR) to analyse success of implemented safety measures, FIA approval required for all chief medical officers and medical centres, safety car made more powerful and may now be used for wet weather starts, accident intervention plan revised.
1998
Narrow track era begins in Formula One; width of car reduced from 2 metres to 1.8 metres. Teams now run tyres with 14 mm grooves (4 on the rear and 3 on the front) to reduce speed, asymmetric braking banned, X-wings banned mid-season, single fuel bladder mandatory, refuelling connector must be covered, cockpit dimensions increased, side impact test now to use 100% more energy, tyre barrier effectiveness increased, pit lane must now have 100 m of straight before first pit garage, increased use of pit lane lights alongside flags.
1999
Number of grooves on front tyres increased from 3 to 4, flexible wings banned, pit lane shielding standardised, some runoff areas to have asphalt instead of sand traps, at least four medical intervention cars and an FIA doctor car required, FIA accident data recorders (ADR) were now required to be in operation during testing, wheels must be tethered to car to reduce the risk of launching components away during an accident, rear and lateral headrest assembly made single-piece and quick-release, engine oil breathers must vent into engine air intake, extractable driver's seat mandatory, frontal impact test speed increased to 13 m/s.

== 2000s ==
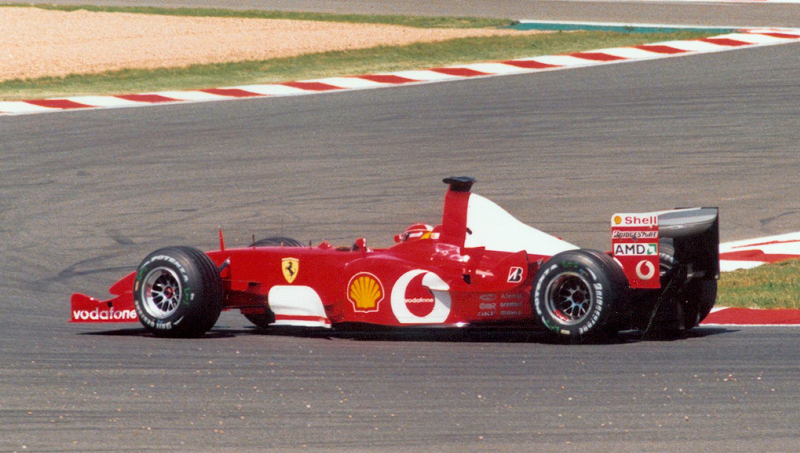
Seven-time World Champion Michael Schumacher on his way to victory at the 2002 French Grand Prix in that season's all-conquering Ferrari F2002.

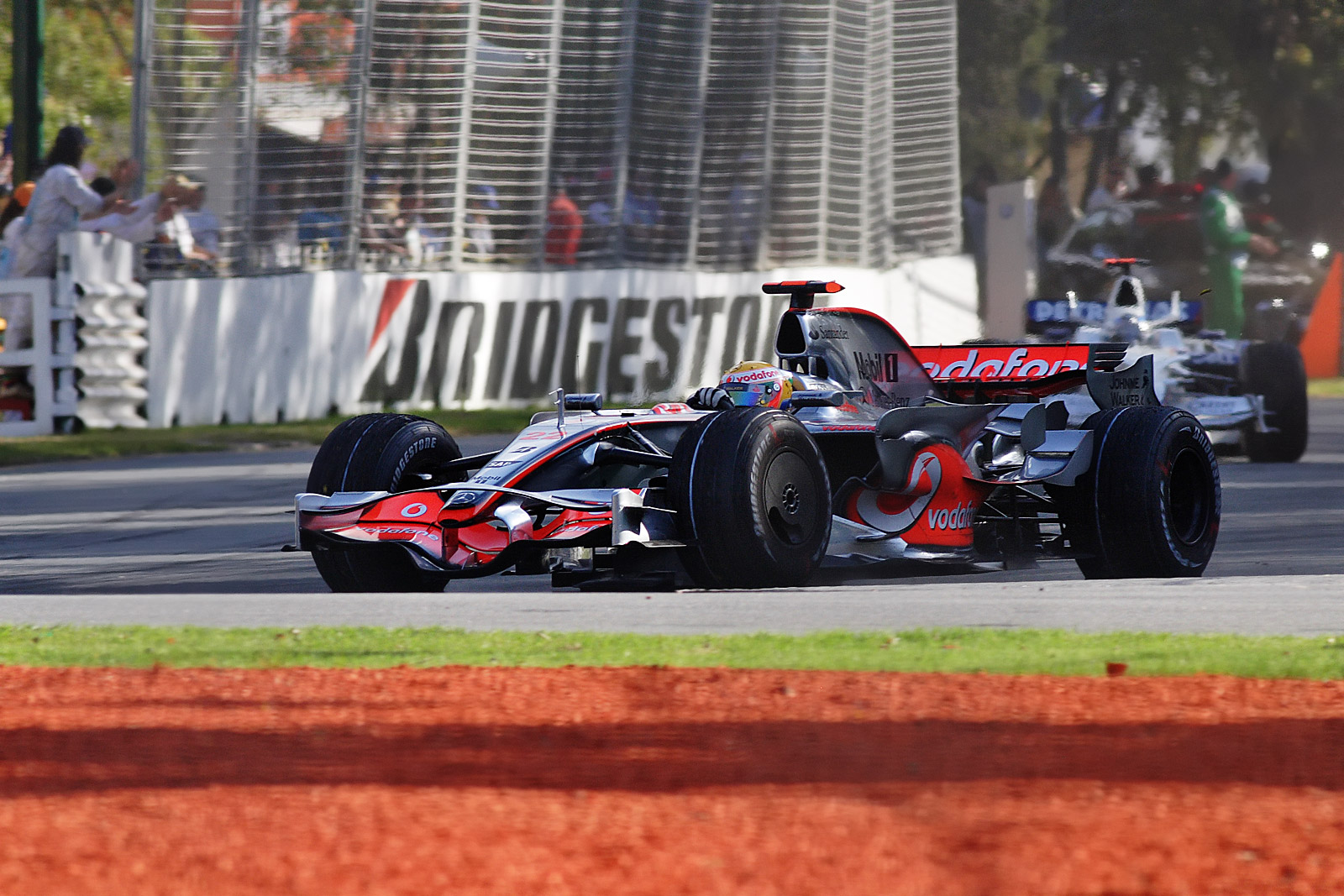
Lewis Hamilton won the 2008 title in only his second season. He is pictured here driving the McLaren MP4-23 at that year's season opener in Australia.

By the end of the 1990s, safety standards had risen dramatically for the second time in 20 years. The deaths of marshals in both 2000 and 2001 after being struck by wheels after accidents at the Italian and Australian Grand Prix respectively showed that the sport would never be completely safe, but on the whole, it was in much better shape safety-wise than it had been before. Save for the introduction of the HANS (head and neck support) system in 2003, there were no major safety improvements in the sport since the turn of the millennium until the introduction of the halo in 2018.

Most of the changes that the FIA made to the regulations in the nine seasons since the year 2000 were aimed at trimming speed from the cars and, later in the decade, reducing the costs involved in Formula One. These have risen by a factor of between three and four for the top teams like Ferrari and McLaren. This sudden increase in budget was due to the influx of big-spending car manufacturers setting up teams in the sport since Mercedes-Benz paved the way by buying 40% of the McLaren team.

By 2008, with the global credit crunch turning into a full-blown global recession, many of the car manufacturers (whose sales were hit hard by the economic crisis) could no longer afford the huge amounts of money they were investing in the sport. The gravity of the situation was realised when Honda suddenly withdrew its participation at the end of the 2008 season, later confirming to have sold the team, specifically blaming the world economic crisis. With Toyota and BMW also withdrawing from the sport at the end of the following year, the remaining manufacturers and the FIA agreed on changes to the rules over the next seasons in an effort to save the sport from collapsing under the weight of its own costs.

2000
Engines mandated to be V10s displacing no more than 3000 cc. Red flag procedure changed, where races stopped after two laps but before three-quarters race distance had been completed are restarted with the cars on the grid in the order they were at the end of the lap before the red-flagged lap; only race order and number of laps completed are taken into account for the new race; time differences between cars are voided; distance of new race is the number of laps remaining from the original race minus three laps. Use of cooled fuel banned mid-season.
2001
Traction control reallowed from the Spanish Grand Prix, as the FIA admit they are unable to police whether teams are using the system effectively to gain a competitive advantage, as are fully automatic transmissions and launch control. use of beryllium alloys in chassis or engine construction banned. Size of cockpit entry template and survival cell increased. Rear wings must have no more than 3 elements.
2002
Team orders banned mid-season after Rubens Barrichello hands victory to Michael Schumacher at final corner of the Austrian Grand Prix. Electronic power steering banned.
2003
Bi-directional telemetry banned, HANS (Head And Neck Support) system mandatory. Change to point scoring system: points now awarded down to 8th place, amount of points to run 10, 8, 6, 5, 4, 3, 2, 1 from 1st to 8th place. Testing allowed on a Friday of a race meeting in exchange for reduction of testing mileage allowed outside of Grand Prix calendar, to make it more affordable for smaller teams. Changes to qualifying session, with only one flying lap now allowed for grid position, with the 107% rule no longer in effect. Cars may not be refuelled between final qualifying and race start.
2004
Engines required to last a whole race meeting, with any engine change to result in 10-place grid penalty. Minimum weight set at 605 kg (1,334 lb) during qualifying and no less than 600 kg (1,300 lb) at all other times (including driver and fuel). Pit lane speed limited to 100 km/h at all times, each driver must select wet and dry weather tyre compounds before the start of the race, minimum size of engine cover and rear wing endplates increased to maximise advertising space, multi-element rear wings banned and two-element wings mandated. Launch control banned again for the second time, along with fully-automatic transmissions. Rear overhang increased from 50 cm (20 in) to 60 cm (24 in), reverting the change from 1991.
2005
Rear diffuser size reduced to limit downforce, all engines now required to last two race weekends. Qualifying format changed to two aggregate times from Saturday afternoon and Sunday morning to count towards grid positions (this format lasted until the European Grand Prix, when qualifying reverted to a driver's fastest single lap to count from Saturday afternoon qualifying). Further changes to dimensions of front and rear wings and nose of car to make overtaking easier, restriction on tyre changes during qualifying and race itself. If a driver stalls on the grid after the parade lap, the other cars will now complete a second lap whilst the stalled vehicle is removed. In the event of a red flag, the two-hour race clock will no longer freeze between race sessions.
2006
Only 14 sets of tyres allowed all weekend (seven dries, four wets, and three extreme wets), in-race tyre changes permitted again, qualifying format changed to three 15-minute shootouts where the slowest cars are eliminated in the first two sessions, leaving the 10 quickest to start with a clean slate and to go for pole position (final session reduced from 20 to 15 minutes from the French Grand Prix onwards). Saturday free practice increased from 45 minutes to 1 hour in length.: Engine design limited to 2400 cc 90-degree 4-valve V8s in an attempt to reduce horsepower (although teams are allowed to run a rev-restricted V10 for an interim period if no engine under the new regulations is available to them), restrictions on use of non-ferrous materials in engine construction.
2007
Tuned mass damper system banned, rev limit of 19,000 rpm introduced, rear wing structure strengthened to prevent flexing, increased rear crash structure strength required. Single tyre supplier (Bridgestone) after withdrawal of Michelin, revised tyre regulations mean drivers must use both hard and soft compound tyres during the course of a race (soft compound tyres are identified by a white stripe in one of the front tyre grooves), engine development frozen until the end of 2008 to cut costs, further restrictions to regulations mean no teams may run a 3rd car on Friday, both sessions on Friday extended to 90 minutes in length, engine changes on first day of practice no longer subject to grid place penalty, pit lane restrictions active during any period the safety car is on the track, annual testing limited to 30,000 km to reduce costs.
2008
Traction control banned for second and final time by means of all teams using a standard electronic control unit (ECU) to eliminate the possibility of teams concealing the technology within their own engine management systems. Strict limits placed on amount of CFD and wind tunnel testing allowed each year.
2009
Banning of almost all aerodynamic devices other than the front and rear wing, slick tyres reallowed (keeping to narrow track dimensions), limit imposed of eight race/qualifying engines for the whole season (every new engine afterwards results in 10-place grid penalty), rev limit decreased to 18,000 rpm. Rear wing width reduced from 1000 mm to 750 mm and height increased from 800 mm to 950 mm, front wing ground clearance reduced from 150 mm to 50 mm and width increased from 1400 mm to 1800 mm. Rear diffuser to be longer and higher, variable front aerodynamic devices permitted (with limited in-car control by the driver), KERS (kinetic energy recovery system) introduced to convert energy generated under braking into a temporary horsepower increase of around 80 bhp that can be used 6.6 seconds per lap by the drivers for overtaking. Pit lane is no longer closed when safety car is deployed. Mid-season testing banned.

== 2010s ==
Previous regulation changes at the tail end of the first decade of the new millennium aimed at improving the show had largely proven to be a failure. With cost escalation now largely under control thanks to recently implemented budget caps and safety standards at an all-time high, the sport's focus for the new decade was around continuing to improve the spectacle. Alongside this, however, was the medium-term objective of making the sport more environmentally aware, both in an effort to secure its future in times of dwindling fossil fuel reserves, and also to bring in new sponsors put off by the sport's image of conspicuous consumption.

2010
Drastic cost-cutting measures introduced. In-race refuelling ban returns; as a result, fuel can be added to any F1 car after qualifying, but Q3 drivers must start the race with the tyres they set their fastest Q3 time with. The same 8-engine limit is maintained despite the increase to 19 races over the course of the season (with the rev limit still at 18,000 rpm). Front tyre width reduced from 270 mm (11 in) to 245 mm (9.6 in). Agreement reached with teams about reducing the number of staff employed. 3 new teams mean 7 drivers are now dropped from Q1 and Q2. Scoring system changed to allow first ten cars to receive points: 25, 18, 15, 12, 10, 8, 6, 4, 2, 1. Backmarkers no longer able to unlap themselves behind safety car. Teams unanimously agree not to use KERS for the 2010 season in order to allow all teams time to develop and perfect their own systems.

2011
Double-diffuser concept banned, with teams using simpler single-piece diffusers. "F-duct" system pioneered by McLaren banned, shark fins disallowed from being connected to the rear wing, adjustable front wings banned. Gearboxes must last for 5 race weekends, but for the season each driver has one penalty-free (a.k.a. "joker") gearbox change at their disposal. 107% rule reintroduced following concerns about new teams' pace. Teams agree to reintroduce KERS, with minimum car weight increasing by 20 kg (44 lb) to offset the weight of the KERS device. Sporting regulations amended to clear up last-lap safety car and qualifying in-lap procedures. Drivers warned to be examples of public road safety following Lewis Hamilton being pulled over following the 2010 Australian Grand Prix; FIA President Jean Todt suggests a policy similar to the NFL Personal Conduct code for suspension or revocation of racing licences. Ban on team orders lifted (although FIA can use disrepute clause for misuse of it).: Driver-adjustable drag reduction system (DRS) rear wing element introduced to help overtaking; can be freely used in practice and qualifying, but restricted to certain "activation zones" on the track during races and only when within 1 second of the next car by the "detection zone". DRS wing must immediately close under braking, and DRS is deactivated in the first 2 laps of each race or when a track is declared wet.

2012
Exhaust tailpipes raised after dispute regarding "blown diffusers" at the 2011 British Grand Prix, car noses reprofiled. Reactive suspension systems, "exotic" engine maps, and use of helium in air guns (to change tyres) banned. Cars must be cleared from all crash tests before pre-season testing. Races capped to four hours (including red flags) following long red flag during 2011 Canadian Grand Prix. In-season testing allowed again at one circuit chosen by the FIA or teams, upon agreement (Mugello Circuit in 2012). Backmarkers once again able to unlap themselves behind safety car.

2013
Further cost-cutting measures introduced, DRS restricted to designated zones during free practice and qualifying, mid-season testing discontinued once more, "modesty panels" introduced to compensate for the previous year's front nose reprofilling, double DRS (pioneered by Mercedes) banned, minimum weight increased to 642 kg (1,415 lb).

2014
New turbocharged 1600 cc V6 engine formula with 8-speed gearbox introduced, which must now last at least 4,000 km (2,500 mi) before being replaced and have the KERS (now known as MGU-K) integrated into it. New penalty point system introduced, teams must select eight gear ratios ahead of the first race, rear beam wings and false camera mountings banned, top 10 drivers must now start the race on the tyres they set their best Q2 time on, in-season testing returns, car noses further reprofiled. New car number system where the driver is able to choose their own number for the duration of their career adopted. Double points awarded for the final race of the season. Each car now has a 100 kg fuel limit per race, and fuel flow is limited to 100 kg per hour, with fuel flow being measured by a new technology adopted by F1: ultrasonic flow meters, increasing the efficiency.

2015
Further nose redesign, drivers restricted further to four engines per year, significant mid-season driver helmet design changes banned, double points no longer awarded for final race, cars proceed to pit lane instead of staying on grid in event of a red flag.

2016
Drivers allowed to use five engines per year, as number of races is 21. Drivers qualifying for Super Licence must be at least eighteen years old and have scored 40 Super Licence points in recognised feeder series.

2017
Car width increased from 1800 mm to 2000 mm (reversing 1998 change). Front tyre width increased from 245 mm to 305 mm; rear tyre width increased from 325 mm to 405 mm. Minimum weight increased to 728 kg (1,605 lb), front wings made wider at 1,800 mm (70.9 in). Teams restricted to four engines per year irrespective of number of races, engine token system abandoned, power unit suppliers now obliged to supply any team without a power unit contract. Shark fins reallowed; T-wings introduced through loophole. Bargeboard sizes increased.

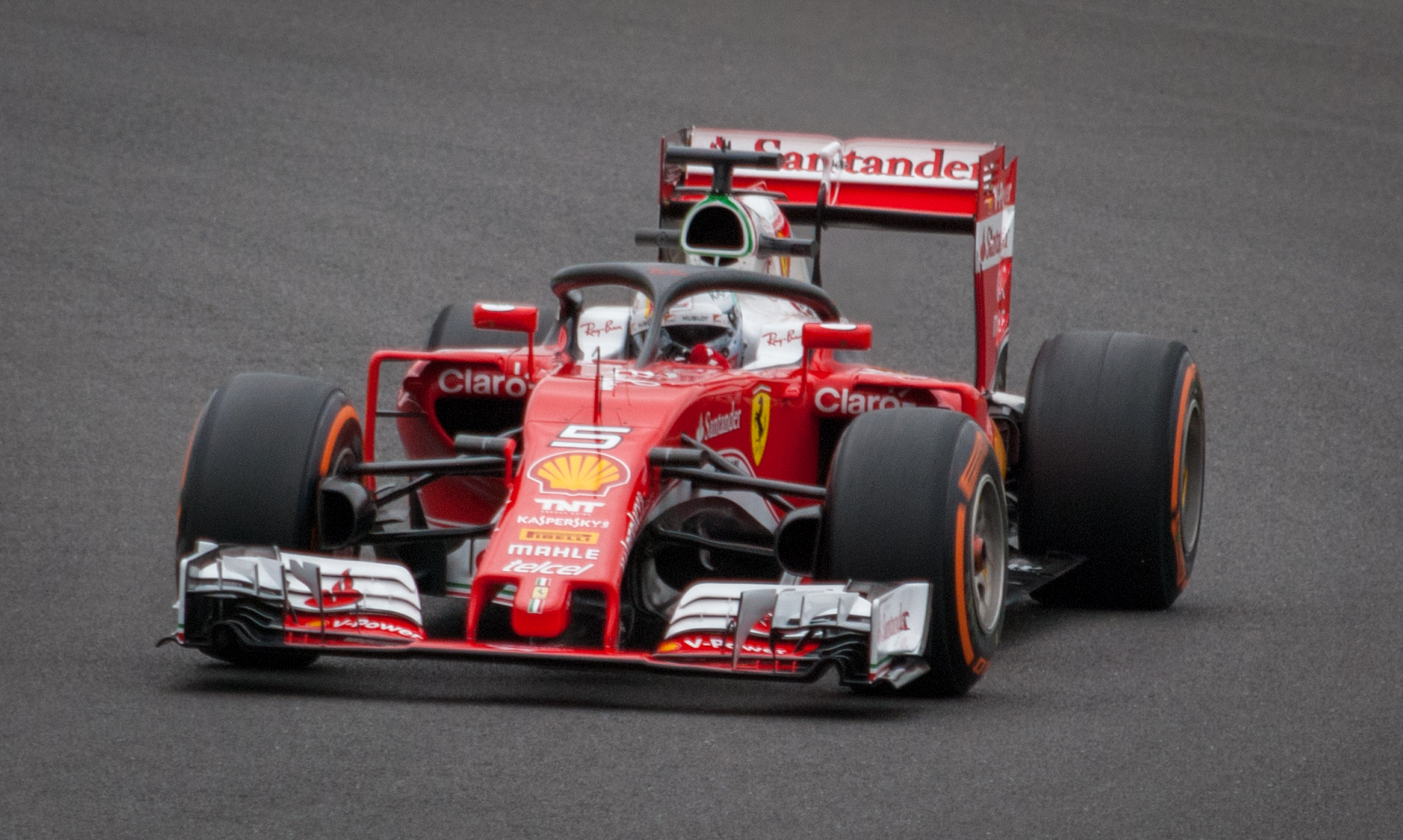
The "halo" cockpit protection device—seen here on a Ferrari SF16-H during testing in 2016—was introduced in 2018.

2018
Drivers restricted to only three engines per year despite number of races increasing to 21. Shark fins and T-wings banned again. After much debate and testing, the halo cockpit protection device is mandated in all FIA open-wheel championships.

2019
Front wing simplified and made 200 mm (7.9 in) wider, 20 mm (0.79 in) higher, and moved 25 mm (0.98 in) further forward. Rear wing made 100 mm (3.9 in) wider and 20 mm (0.79 in) higher, with a 20 mm (0.79 in) larger DRS opening to improve DRS, reduce dirty air, and further promote overtaking. Winglets removed from brake ducts. Maximum fuel capacity increased from 105 kg (231 lb) to 110 kg (240 lb) to minimise the need for drivers to conserve fuel during a race. Car weight no longer includes driver weight. Bonus point awarded to driver and constructor who sets race fastest lap for the first time since 1959, but the driver must finish in a points-scoring position to receive the bonus point.

== 2020s ==
2021, 2022 and 2026 Formula One cars

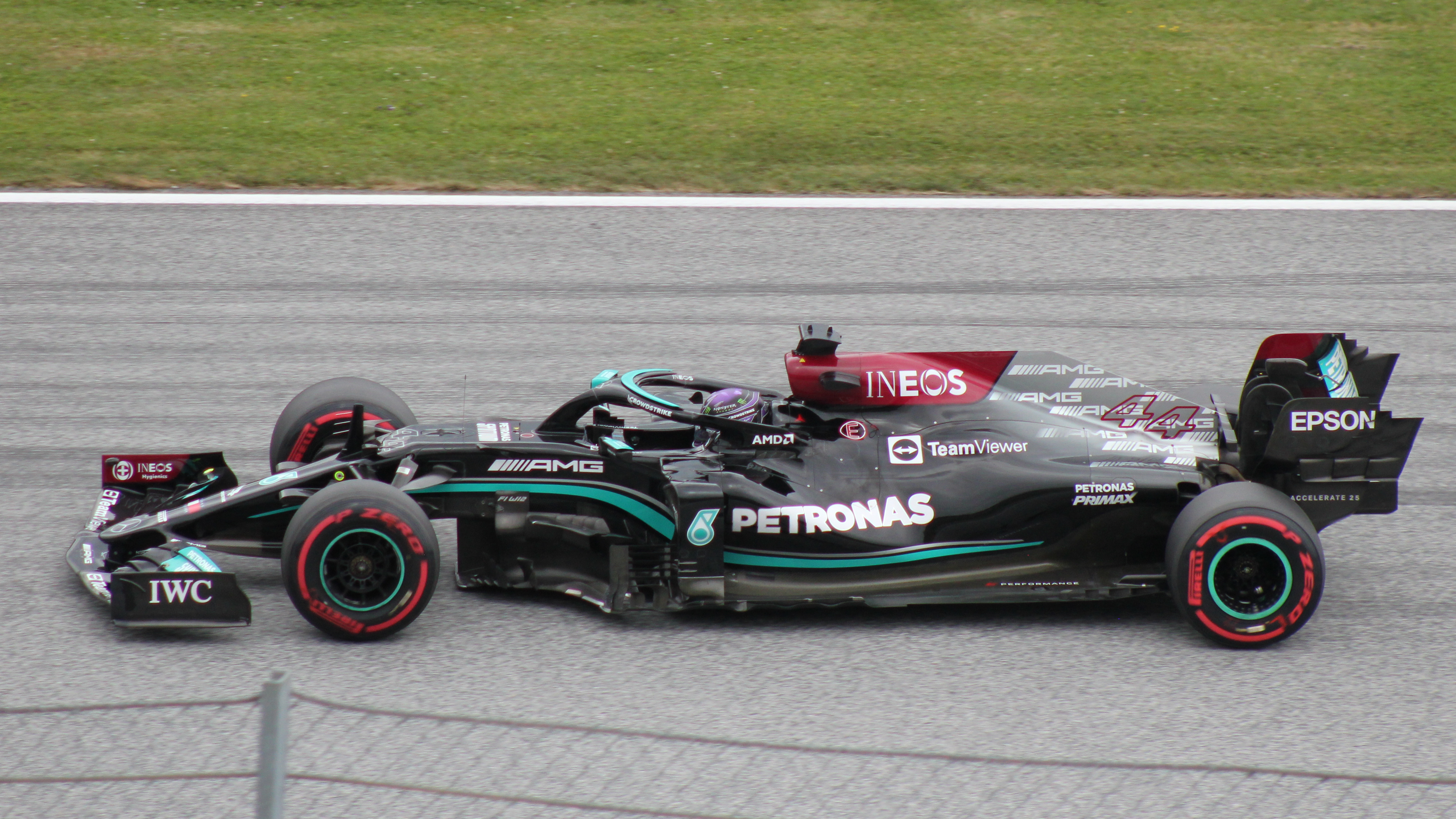
Lewis Hamilton's Mercedes W12 at the 2021 Austrian Grand Prix.

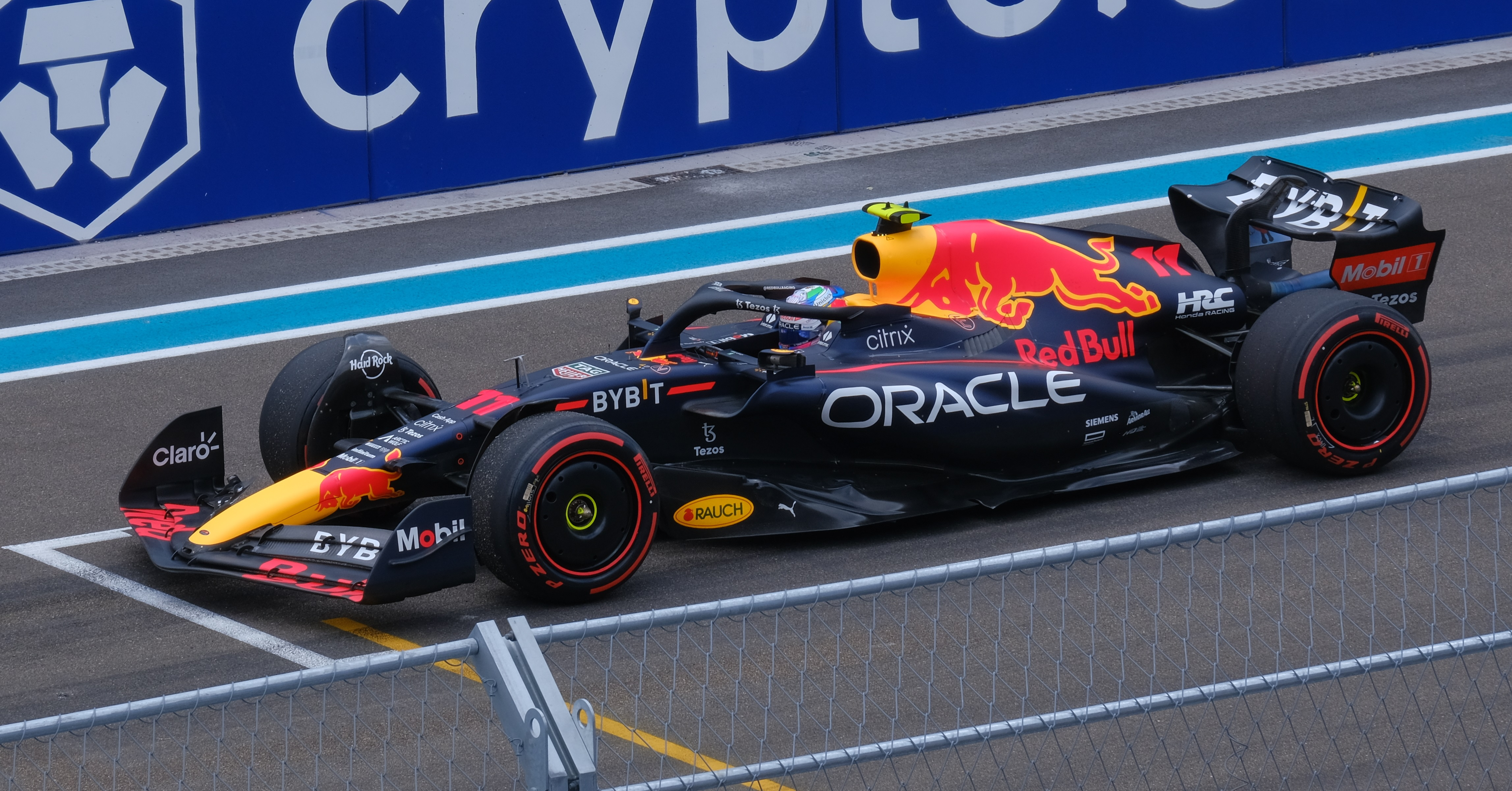
Sergio Pérez's Red Bull RB18 at the 2022 Miami Grand Prix.

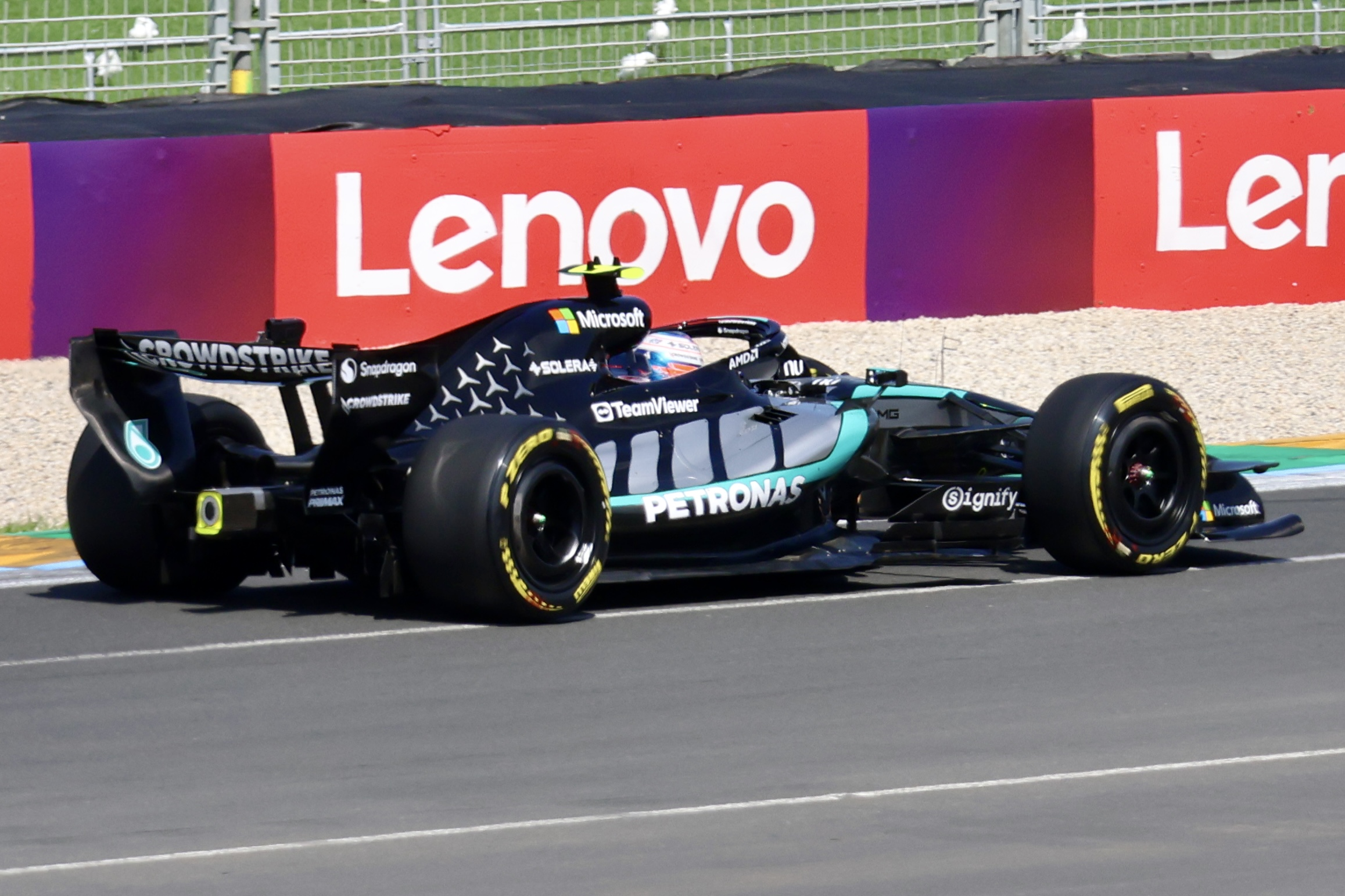
Kimi Antonelli's Mercedes W17 at the 2026 Australian Grand Prix.

Between the 2021 and 2022 seasons, major changes were made to the regulations to allow the usage of ground effect within the cars themselves. As such, a major change to the cars' aerodynamics and designs was mandated. A further change occurred in 2026 which eliminated the ground effect in favour of "active aerodynamic" modes and ERS and battery management.

The 2020s saw the emergence of the COVID-19 pandemic, which curtailed major sports events across the world, including Formula One and related feeder events. The 2020 Australian Grand Prix was cancelled minutes prior to the first practice session. The pandemic led to restrictions concerning car development; while the 2020 cars would be reused for the following season, the FIA implemented a token system that could be exchanged for new car components for the 2021 season (McLaren was granted special permission to change the engine for the 2021 season from Renault to Mercedes power units). Postponement and outright cancellation of several races intended to be held occurred, and new regulations intended to be introduced during the 2021 season were postponed to the following year. Formula One would return with a shorter race calendar in Austria for the running of the 2020 Austrian Grand Prix. To prevent the spread of COVID-19, most races during the 2020 and 2021 seasons were held behind closed doors or with reduced crowd capacity; by the 2021 French Grand Prix, however, crowd participation had returned, and by 2023, most COVID-19 safety protocols were relaxed.

Minor aerodynamic changes occurred in 2020 and 2021 due to the onset of the pandemic, which also pushed new regulations intended for introduction during the latter year to 2022. Said new regulations resulted in a major redesign to the cars for the first time since 2017 with the reintroduction of ground effect. After three years of minor tweaks to the ground effect ruleset, it was scrapped outright for a new "active aerodynamic" system in 2026.

2020
Teams allowed one additional MGU-K replacement. Free practice sessions now count towards Super Licence points, requiring at least 100 km (62 mi) without infractions to receive one, with a limit of ten Super Licence points across a three-season period from free practice sessions. The last 50 mm (2.0 in) of the front wings must not contain any metals as a puncture prevention measure; from 2020 Italian Grand Prix, drivers must use the same engine mode in both qualifying and race, thereby banning engine "party modes".

2021
Budget cap of $145 million introduced. Dual-axis steering (DAS) system pioneered by Mercedes banned. Teams agree to use 2020 cars in 2021, with development being done on a token basis as a result of the COVID-19 pandemic disrupting car development. Cars are under parc fermé conditions following the end of free practice 3 instead of qualifying.

2022
Ground effect reintroduced, having been outlawed in Formula One since the 1983 season. The car's underbody becomes the main source of aerodynamic grip, eliminating the need for bargeboards. Front wing and endplates simplified; rear wings now wider and mounted higher. Amount of aerodynamic updates across an entire season restricted to cut costs. Wheel diameter increased from 13 to 18 inches (33 to 46 cm). Inerters were banned to simplify suspension design. Following controversy from the shortened 2021 Belgian Grand Prix, which saw one lap (the entire race) being run behind the safety car amidst torrential rain, the points system concerning unfinished races is altered—should a race be suspended due to any reason, fewer points are awarded depending on a percentage of the completed race distance. Safety car procedure altered following controversy surrounding the final lap of the 2021 Abu Dhabi Grand Prix; safety car will now be drawn in a lap after the instruction for lapped cars to unlap themselves is broadcast, wording of regulations altered to clarify that "all" cars must unlap themselves, not "any". Q2 tyre rule (in place since 2014) scrapped, allowing the top 10 drivers from qualifying a free choice of starting tyre for the race.

2023
Minor changes introduced to aerodynamics following reports of excessive porpoising during 2022 season. Lateral floor deflection tests made more stringent. Halo roll hoop now requires a rounded top in response to Zhou Guanyu's crash at the 2022 British Grand Prix to prevent it from digging into the ground on subsequent rollovers. Points awarding system changed once again after controversy surrounding shortened 2022 Japanese Grand Prix, which ran 28 out of 53 laps; races that do not reach the 75 percent distance are awarded shortened race points regardless of whether the race finishes under red or green flag conditions. Previously, half points were only awarded if a shortened race finished under red flag conditions. Pirelli full wet tyres introduced in response to 2021 Belgian Grand Prix, intended to debut at Imola but first seeing use at Monaco. This new compound does not require conventional tyre warmers.

2024
Development of 2026 cars outlawed until 2025. Teams allowed to install scoops for cockpit and driver ventilation following concerns regarding extreme heat during the 2023 Qatar Grand Prix. Sprint weekend structure modified again: weekend begins with single practice session and sprint qualifying on Friday, followed by sprint itself on Saturday. Qualifying begins after the sprint, and then on Sunday, the race is held. Two parc fermé periods are observed during a sprint weekend; the first encompassing both sprint events, and the other following qualification and then the Grand Prix itself. DRS allowed after one lap of a race start, safety car restart, or red flag restart. Teams can now use up to four power units before taking a grid penalty.

2025
Teams now allowed to develop 2026 cars. Fastest lap point (reintroduced in 2019) abolished. Minimum driver weight allowance increased from 80 kg (176.4 lb) to 82 kg (180.8 lb); overall minimum car weight without fuel increased from 798 kg (1,759 lb) to 800 kg (1,764 lb). New driver cooling system introduced and mandated for extreme heat situations (over 30.5 °C), increasing minimum car weight (including driver) by 5 kg (11 lb) to compensate. Limit on amount of gearboxes that can be used by one team to be abolished. Due to an incident involving Sergio Pérez in the previous season, cars suffering from significant damage, be it mechanical or structural, must retire at the nearest safe location instead of going to the pit lane to retire. In its final year of usage, DRS parameters changed to reduce minimum gap from 10–15 millimetres (0.39–0.59 in) to 9.4–13 millimetres (0.37–0.51 in); upper boundary remains at 85 millimetres (3.3 in) with DRS open. Two DRS modes are permitted; should the driver disengage DRS, the wing must return exactly as defined to the initial mode. Stricter deflection tests on rear wing to be carried out in Australia, with front wing tests to be included from Spanish Grand Prix. During free practice, young drivers will be fielded up to two times per season per car, increasing from once per season per car. Restrictions revolving around the testing of previous-season cars (TPC) tightened: 20-day limit to be imposed, testing only to occur on tracks on previous year's calendar within the last year and not within 60 days of a Formula One race, and drivers currently competing in the championship now restricted to covering a maximum of 1,000 kilometres (620 mi) over 4 days of testing.: Should qualifying be cancelled outright (i.e. due to bad weather), grid is set according to Drivers' Championship standings before the event. Starting grid protocol for withdrawing a car before race start amended; final starting grid to be determined one hour before the race, with any car withdrawn up to 75 minutes before start being excluded from final grid, with all cars moving up their relevant positions.: Following punishments given out in 2024, drivers' public comments, including profanity, language which may lead to the "moral injury or loss to the FIA, its bodies, its members or its executive officers", and "political, religious and personal statements or comments", will be regulated, with harsher punishments being issued upon infraction, such as fines, suspension, or deduction of points. Any statements of the latter nature warrant retraction and a full apology.

2026
Cars are shorter and lighter in an attempt to make them much more nimble. Ground effect is reduced with the addition of "active aerodynamics" two modes that move the front and rear wings are made available to drivers - one for high downforce and one for low drag on straights. DRS is dropped, and three different ERS activation modes are available: "boost" for regular deployment, "recharge" for harvesting energy, and "overtake" for the usage of extra energy to aid in overtaking on track, similar to DRS. MGU-H has been removed. Formula One cars will now use sustainable fuel. With the introduction of 100% sustainable fuels, FIA now measures not only 100 kg of fuel per hour but also the fuel's energy density, with a limit of 3000 MJ/h. Drivers may now change their permanent driver numbers.

== See also ==
- Formula One
- Formula One regulations
- Formula One engines
- Formula One tyres
- List of Formula One circuits
- List of Formula One fatal accidents
- 1978 Italian Grand Prix
- 1994 San Marino Grand Prix
- Regenerative braking
- 2009 Formula One World Championship
