= Road bicycle racing =

Bicycle racing sport

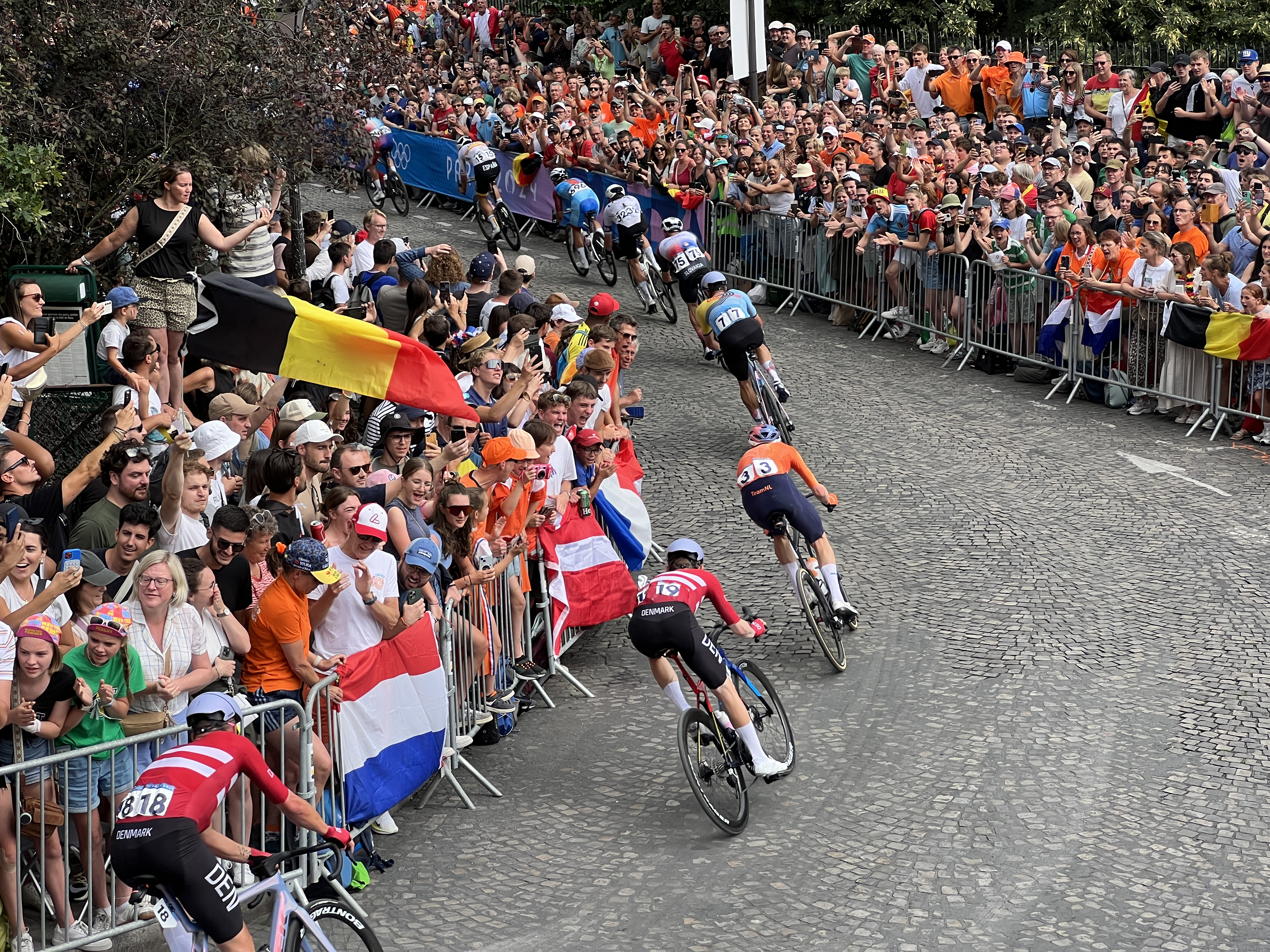
- Riders during the 2024 Summer Olympics
- Highest governing body: UCI

Characteristics
- Contact: No, although bodies do touch
- Team members: Individuals and teams
- Mixed-sex: Yes, separate competitions
- Type: Cycle sport
- Equipment: Road bicycle
- Venue: Paved roads

Presence
- Country or region: Worldwide
- Olympic: Yes, men's since the 1896 Olympics and women's since the 1984 Olympics
- World Championships: Yes
- Paralympic: Yes, men's and women's since the 1984 Paralympics

Pictogram for Cycling at the Summer Olympics

Road bicycle racing is the cycle sport discipline of road cycling, held primarily on paved roads. Road racing is the most popular professional form of bicycle racing, in terms of numbers of competitors, events and spectators. The two most common competition formats are mass start events, where riders start simultaneously and race to a set finish point; and time trials, where individual riders or teams race a course alone against the clock. Stage races or "tours" take multiple days, and consist of several mass-start or time-trial stages ridden consecutively.

Professional racing originated in Western Europe, centred in France, Spain, Italy and the Low Countries. Since the mid-1980s, the sport has diversified, with races held at the professional, semi-professional and amateur levels, worldwide. The sport is governed by the Union Cycliste Internationale (UCI). As well as the UCI's annual World Championships for men and women, the biggest event is the Tour de France, a three-week race that can attract over 500,000 roadside supporters a day.

== History ==
Road racing in its modern form originated in the late 19th century. It began as an organized sport in 1868. One of the first known races being Paris-Rouen. The sport was popular in the western European countries of France, Spain, Belgium, and Italy, and some of those earliest road bicycle races remain among the sport's biggest events. These early races include Liège–Bastogne–Liège (established 1892), Paris–Roubaix (1896), the Tour de France (1903), the Milan–San Remo and Giro di Lombardia (1905), the Giro d'Italia (1909), the Volta a Catalunya (1911), and the Tour of Flanders (1913). They provided a template for other races around the world.

Cycling has been part of the Summer Olympic Games since the modern sequence started in Athens in 1896.

Historically, the most competitive and devoted countries since the beginning of 20th century were Belgium, France and Italy, then road cycling spread in Colombia, Denmark, Germany, Luxembourg, the Netherlands, Portugal, Spain and Switzerland after World War II. However, as the sport grows in popularity through globalization, countries such as Kazakhstan, Australia, Russia, Slovakia, South Africa, Ecuador, New Zealand, Norway, the United Kingdom, Ireland, Poland and the United States continue to produce world-class cyclists.

The first women's road championships were held in France in 1951. A women's road race discipline was added to the UCI Road World Championships at the 31st edition of the World Championships in 1958 in Reims.

== Road race types ==
=== One-day ===
Professional single-day race distances may be as long as 180 miles (290 km). Courses may run from place to place or comprise one or more laps of a circuit; some courses combine both, i.e., taking the riders from a starting place and then finishing with several laps of a circuit (usually to ensure a good spectacle for spectators at the finish). Races over short circuits, often in town or city centres, are known as criteriums.

=== Time trial ===
Individual time trial (ITT) is an event in which cyclists race alone against the clock on flat or rolling terrain, or up a mountain road. A team time trial (TTT), including two-man team time trial, is a road-based bicycle race in which teams of cyclists race against the clock. In both team and individual time trials, the cyclists start the race at different times so that each start is fair and equal. Unlike individual time trials where competitors are not permitted to 'draft' (ride in the slipstream) behind each other, in team time trials, riders in each team employ this as their main tactic, each member taking a turn at the front while teammates 'sit in' behind. Race distances vary from a few kilometres (typically a prologue, an individual time trial of usually less than 8 kilometres (5 mi) before a stage race, used to determine which rider wears the leader's jersey on the first stage) to between approximately 30 and 100 kilometres (20 and 60 mi).

=== Stage races ===
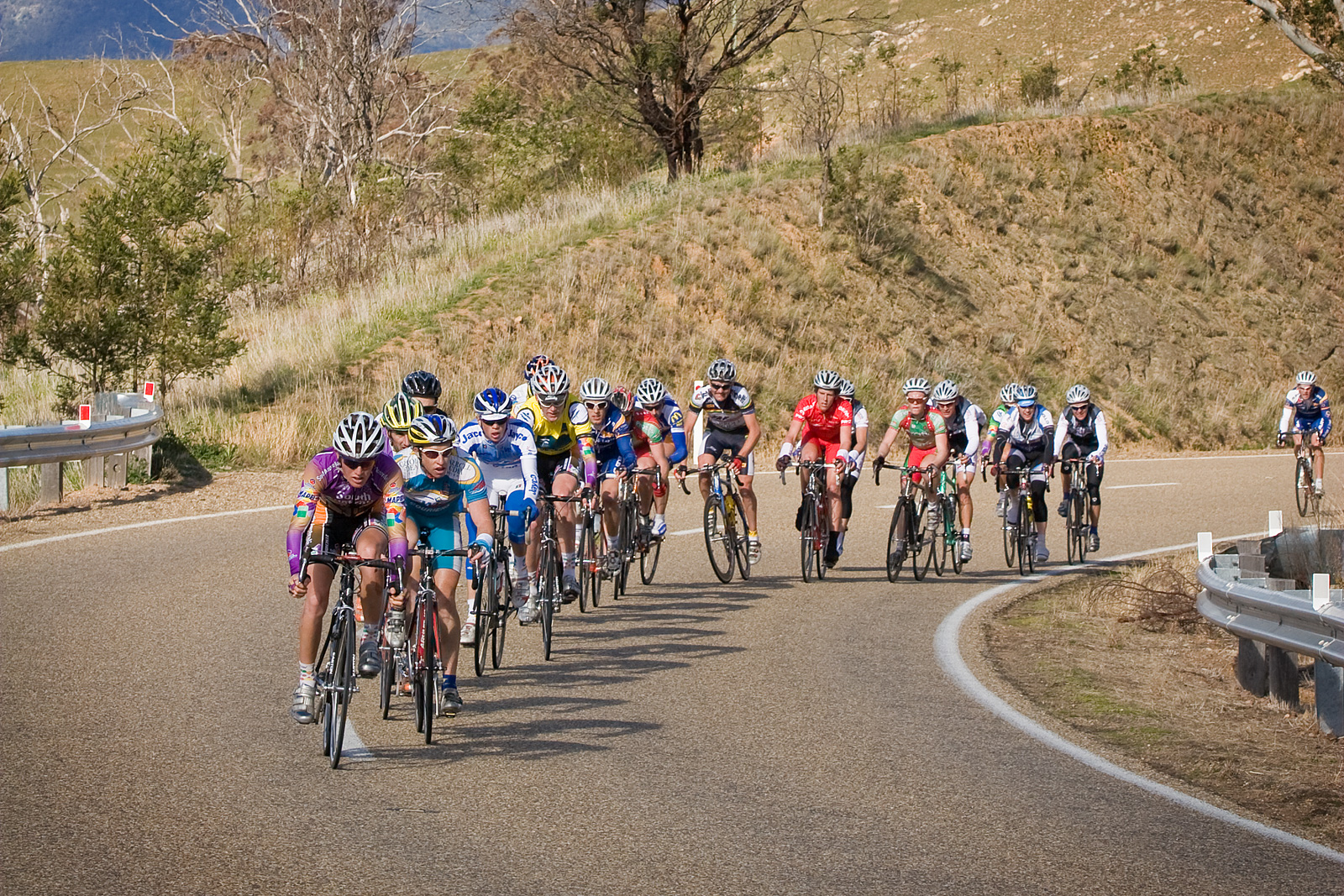
The Tour of Gippsland, a stage race in Australia, climbing through the Omeo Shire

Stage races consist of several races, or stages, ridden consecutively. The competitor with the lowest cumulative time to complete all stages is declared the overall, or general classification (GC), winner. Stage races may also have other classifications and awards, such as individual stage winners, the points classification winner, and the "King of the Mountains" (or mountains classification) winner. A stage race can also be a series of road races and individual time trials (some events include team time trials). The stage winner is the first person to cross the finish line that day or the time trial rider (or team) with the lowest time on the course. The overall winner of a stage race is the rider who takes the lowest aggregate time to complete all stages (accordingly, a rider does not have to win all or any of the individual stages to win overall). Three-week stage races are called Grand Tours. The professional road bicycle racing calendar includes three Grand Tours – the Giro d'Italia, the Tour de France, and the Vuelta a España.

=== Randonneuring and ultra-distance ===
Ultra-distance cycling races are very long single stage events where the race clock continuously runs from start to finish. Their sanctioning bodies are usually independent of the UCI. They usually last several days and the riders take breaks on their own schedules, with the winner being the first one to cross the finish line. Among the best-known ultramarathons is the Race Across America (RAAM), a coast-to-coast non-stop, single-stage race in which riders cover approximately 4,800 kilometres (3,000 mi) in about a week. The race is sanctioned by the Ultramarathon Cycling Association (UMCA). RAAM and similar events allow (and often require) racers to be supported by a team of staff; there are also ultra-distance bicycle races that prohibit all external support, such as the Transcontinental Race and the Indian Pacific Wheel Race.

The related activity of randonneuring is not strictly a form of racing, but involves cycling a pre-determined course within a specified time limit.

== Equipment ==
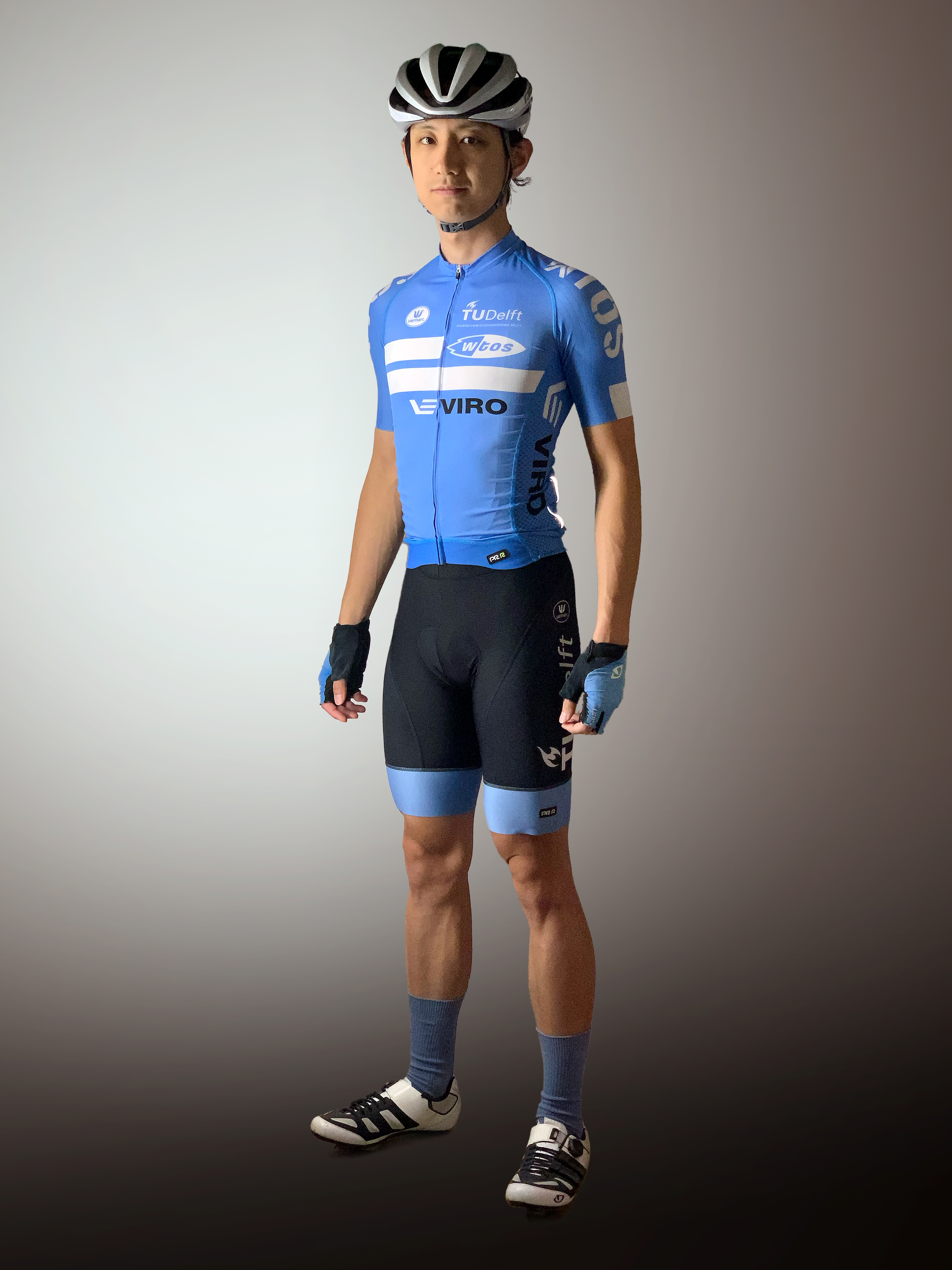
A road cyclist wearing a summer cycling attire.

The most commonly used bicycle in road races are simply known as racing bicycles. Their design is strictly regulated by the UCI, the sport's governing body. Specialist time trial bicycles are used for time trial events.

Bicycles approved for use under UCI regulations must be made available for commercial sale and it is commonplace for amateur cyclists to own bicycles that are identical to those used to win major races.

Clothing worn for road racing is designed to improve aerodynamics and improve rider comfort. The rider's shorts contain padding to improve comfort, and materials are chosen to manage rider temperature, manage sweat, and keep the rider as warm and dry as feasible in wet conditions. Cycling jerseys were originally made of wool; modern jerseys are made of synthetic fabrics such as lycra.

Bicycle helmets were made mandatory for professional road racing in 2003, after the death of cyclist Andrey Kivilev.

== Tactics ==
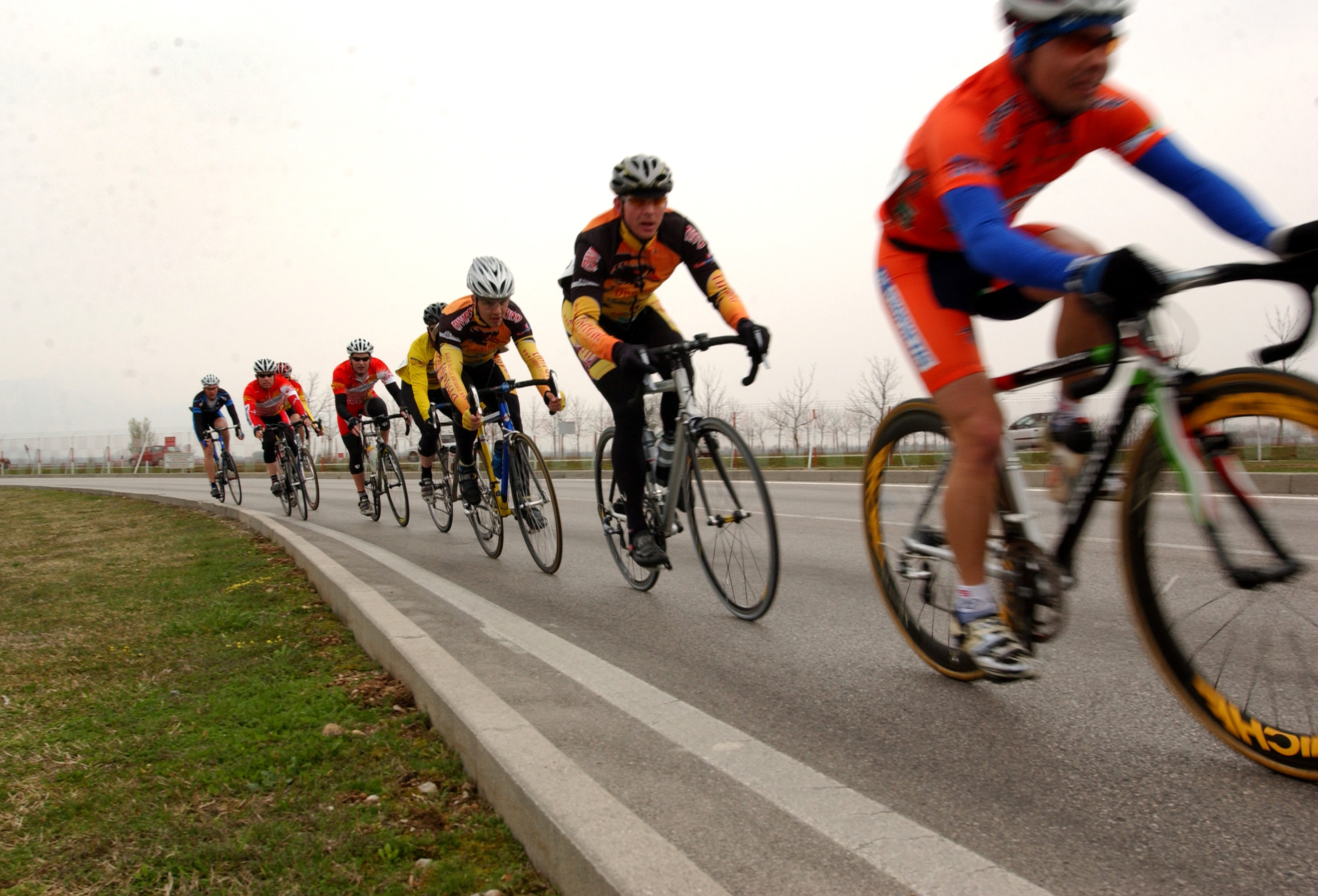
Cyclists drafting behind one another, forming a paceline

A number of tactics are employed to reach the objective of a race. This objective is being the first to cross the finish line in the case of a single-stage race, and clocking the least aggregate finish time in the case of a multi-stage race.

=== Drafting ===
Tactics are based on the aerodynamic benefit of drafting, whereby a rider can significantly reduce the required pedal effort by closely following in the slipstream of the rider in front. Riding in the main field, or peloton, can save as much as 40% of the energy employed in forward motion when compared to riding alone. Some teams designate a leader, whom the rest of the team is charged with keeping out of the wind and in good position until a critical section of the race. This can be used as a strength or a weakness by competitors; riders can cooperate and draft each other to ride at high speed (a paceline or echelon), or one rider can sit on a competitor's wheel (not taking turns riding in the front, or pulling), forcing the other person to do a greater share of the work in maintaining the pace and to potentially tire earlier. Drafting is not permitted in individual time trials.

=== Breaks ===
A group of riders that "breaks away" (a "break") from the peloton has more space and freedom, and can therefore be at an advantage in certain situations. Working together smoothly and efficiently, a small group can potentially maintain a higher speed than the peloton, in which the remaining riders may not be as motivated or organized to chase effectively. Usually a rider or group of riders will try to break from the peloton by attacking and riding ahead to reduce the number of contenders for the win. If the break does not succeed and the body of cyclists comes back together, a sprinter will often win by overpowering competitors in the final stretch. Teamwork between riders, both pre-arranged and ad hoc, is important in many aspects: in preventing or helping a successful break, and sometimes in delivering a sprinter to the front of the field.

=== Terrain and conditions ===
To make the course more selective, races often feature difficult sections such as tough climbs, fast descents, and sometimes technical surfaces (such as the cobbled pavé used in the Paris–Roubaix race). The effects of drafting are reduced in these difficult sections, allowing the strongest riders in the conditions to drop weaker riders, reducing the number of direct competitors able to take the win. Weather, particularly wind, is also an important discriminating factor.

==== Climbs ====
Climbs are excellent places for a single rider to try to break away from a bunch, as the lower riding speeds in a climb seriously reduce the drafting advantage of the bunch. The escaping rider can then further capitalize on that rider's position in the descent, as going downhill alone allows for more maneuvering space and therefore higher speeds than when in a bunch. In addition, because the bunch riders are keeping more space between them for safety reasons, their drafting benefits are again reduced. If this action takes place relatively close to the target (e.g. another bunch ahead, or the finish), the ride over flatter terrain after the descent is not long enough to let the drafting effect (which is then working at full power again) make the bunch catch up, making a climb escape even more attractive.

==== Crosswinds ====
Wind conditions can also make otherwise routine sections of a course potentially selective. Crosswinds, particularly, alter the position of the "shadow" when drafting a rider, usually placing it diagonally behind the lead rider, forming a line of riders called an echelon. To take advantage of this, an attacking rider rides at high speed at the front of the peloton, on the opposite side of the road from which the crosswind is blowing. Following riders are unable to fully shelter from the wind. If such tactics are maintained for long enough, a weaker rider somewhere in the line will be unable to keep contact with the rider directly ahead, causing the peloton to split up.

=== Speed ===
As well as exceptional fitness, successful riders must develop excellent bike handling skills to ride at high speeds in close quarters with other riders. Individual riders can reach speeds of 110 km/h (68 mph) while descending winding mountain roads and may reach 60 to 80 km/h (37 to 50 mph) level speeds during the final sprint to the finish line. Across a long stage race, such as a Grand Tour, the winner's average speed is usually near 40 km/h (25 mph).

=== Gruppetto ===
In more organized races, a SAG wagon ("support and gear") or broom wagon follows the race to pick up stragglers. In professional stage racing riders who are not in a position to win the race or assist a teammate, will usually attempt to ride to the finish within a specified percentage of the winner's finishing time, to be permitted to start the next day's stage. Often, riders in this situation band together to minimize the effort required to finish within the time limit; this group of riders is known as the gruppetto or autobus. In one-day racing, professionals who no longer have any chance to affect the race outcome will routinely withdraw, even if they are uninjured and capable of riding to the finish.

== Teams ==
While the principle remains that the winner is the first to cross the line, many riders are grouped together in teams, usually with commercial sponsors. On professional and semi-professional teams, team names are typically synonymous with the primary sponsors. As an example, some prominent professional teams of the last 30 years have been Team Telekom, Rabobank, ONCE, Mapei and Lampre. The size of the team varies, from three in an amateur event for club riders to eight in professional races. Team riders decide between themselves, before and during the race, who has the best chance of winning. The choice will depend on hills, the chances that the whole field will finish together in a sprint, and other factors. The other riders on the team, or domestiques, will devote themselves to promoting the leader's chances, taking turns in the wind for him, refusing to chase with the peloton when he or she escapes, and so on. The goal is usually to allow the leader to have enough energy to take off at the critical point of the race and go on to victory. However, there can be many alternative scenarios depending on the strength of teams and the race situation.

One example of team tactics involves placing a strong domestique in a breakaway (rather than the designated team leader). If the domestique has a good chance of winning if the breakaway is not brought back, it places the onus on other teams with favoured riders to expend energy chasing the breakaway, impeding their efforts to assist their leader in the final stages of the race. For instance, in the 2012 London Olympics men's road race the outright favourite was sprinter Mark Cavendish riding for the team of Great Britain. Another favoured rider was Matthew Goss riding for the Australian team. By placing Stuart O'Grady in the breakaway, the Australian team was able to force the British team to take primary responsibility for the chase and absolve themselves of the responsibility.

In professional races, team coordination is often performed by radio communication between the riders and the team director, who travels in a team car behind the race and monitors the overall situation. The influence of radios on race tactics is a topic of discussion among the cycling community, with some arguing that the introduction of radios in the 1990s has devalued the tactical knowledge of individual riders and has led to less exciting racing. In September 2009, the Union Cycliste Internationale (UCI), the governing body of pro cycling, voted to phase in a ban on the use of team radios in men's elite road racing. However, after protests from teams, the ban introduced in 2011 excluded races on the top-level men's and women's circuits (the UCI World Tour and UCI Women's Road World Cup) and in 2015 the UCI reversed its stance, allowing race radios to be used in class HC and class 1 events from the 2016 season.

== Types of riders ==
Within the discipline of road racing, from young age different cyclists have different (relative) strengths and weaknesses. Depending on these, riders tend to prefer different events over particular courses, and perform different tactical roles within a team.

The main specialities in road bicycle racing are:

- Climber
- Puncheur
- Breakaway specialist, or baroudeur
- Time trialist
- Rouleur
- Sprinter
- Domestique
- All-rounder

== Stage-race ranking ==
In a stage race a stage ranking is drawn up at the end of each stage, showing for each participating rider the completion time of the stage. The one with the lowest completion time wins the stage. At the same time a general ranking shows the cumulative finishing times of all prior stages for each participating rider. A rider who does not complete any of the stages within its respective time limit is disqualified. The one with the lowest total cumulative time is the general leader. The general leader typically wears a distinctive jersey (yellow in the Tour de France) and generally maintains a position near the head of the main mass of riders (the peloton), surrounded by team members, whose job it is to protect the leader.

Contenders for the general lead may stage "attacks" to distance themselves from the leader in "breakaways". The general leader's vulnerability to breakaways is higher when the escaping riders trail by a small time difference in the general ranking, and as number of remaining stages diminishes. Riders, who finish in the stage ranking behind the general leader, increase their cumulative time disadvantage. Whereas those who finish ahead of the general leader decrease their time disadvantage and may even gain sufficient time to unseat the general leader. After each stage, the racer with the lowest cumulative time becomes (or remains) the general leader.

The general leader does not generally react to breakaways by riders who trail substantially in cumulative time. Such escapes usually achieve other goals, such as winning the stage, collecting sprinting or mountain points, or just creating air time for their team sponsors as a dedicated camera bike typically accompanies the breakaway group.

== Notable bicycle races ==
=== Grand Tours ===
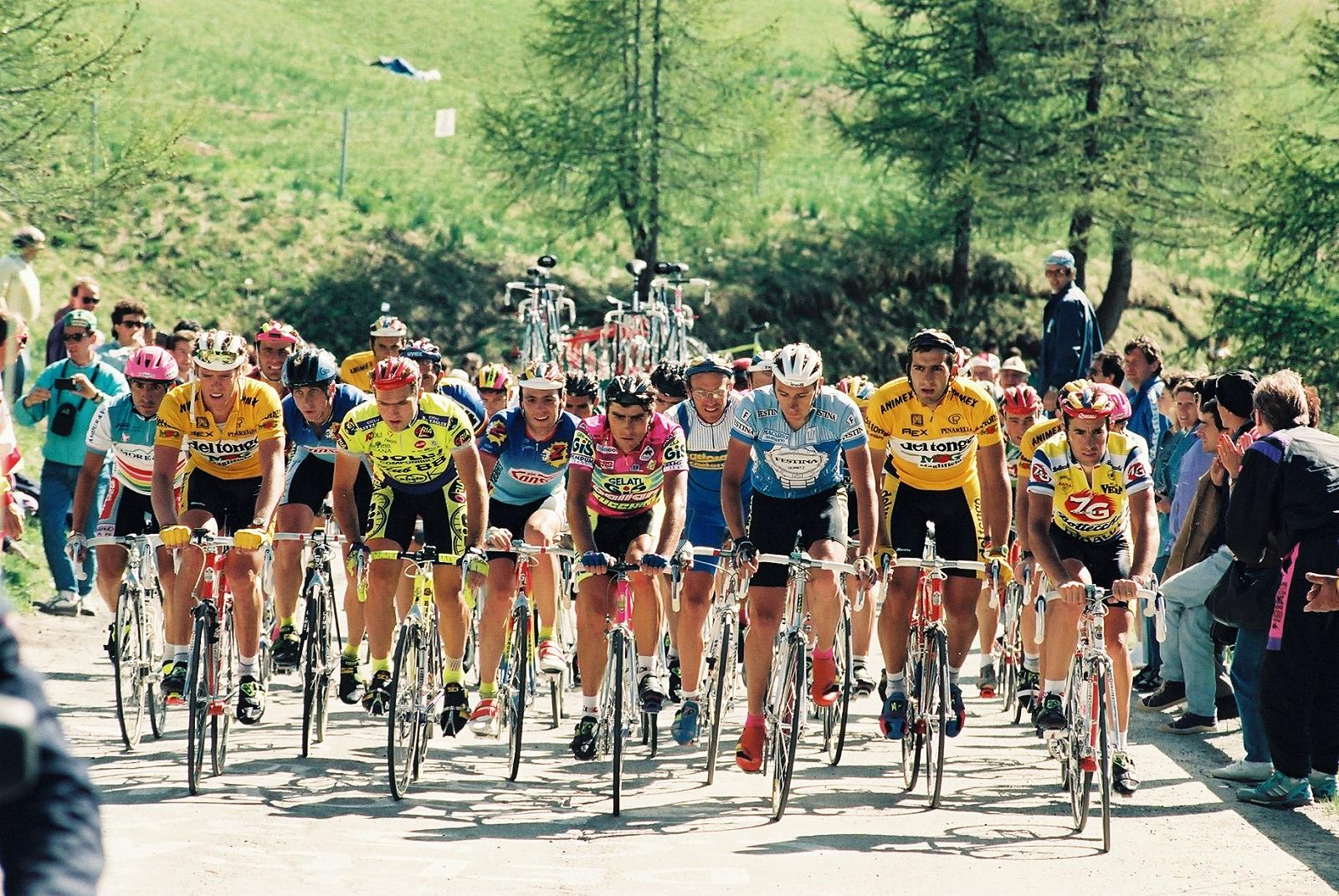
The 1991 Giro d'Italia. The Giro is one of three Grand Tours.

Notable cycling races include the Tour de France, a three-week stage race principally through France and ending in Paris, the Giro d'Italia in Italy, and the Vuelta a España in Spain. Each of these races is considered a "Grand Tour".

=== UCI World Tour ===
Professional racing is governed by the Union Cycliste Internationale. In 2005 it instituted the UCI ProTour (renamed UCI World Tour in 2011) to replace the UCI Road World Cup series. While the World Cup contained only one-day races, the World Tour includes the Grand Tours and other large stage races such as Critérium du Dauphiné, Paris–Nice, Tour de Suisse and the Volta a Catalunya.

The former UCI Road World Cup one-day classic cycle races – which include all five "Monuments" – were also part of the ProTour: Milan–San Remo (Italy), Tour of Flanders (Belgium), Paris–Roubaix (France), Liège–Bastogne–Liège (Belgium) and Amstel Gold Race (Netherlands) in the spring, and Clásica de San Sebastián (Spain), HEW Cyclassics (Germany), Züri-Metzgete (Switzerland, until 2006), Paris–Tours (France, until 2007) and Giro di Lombardia (Italy) in the autumn season.

=== Olympic Games ===
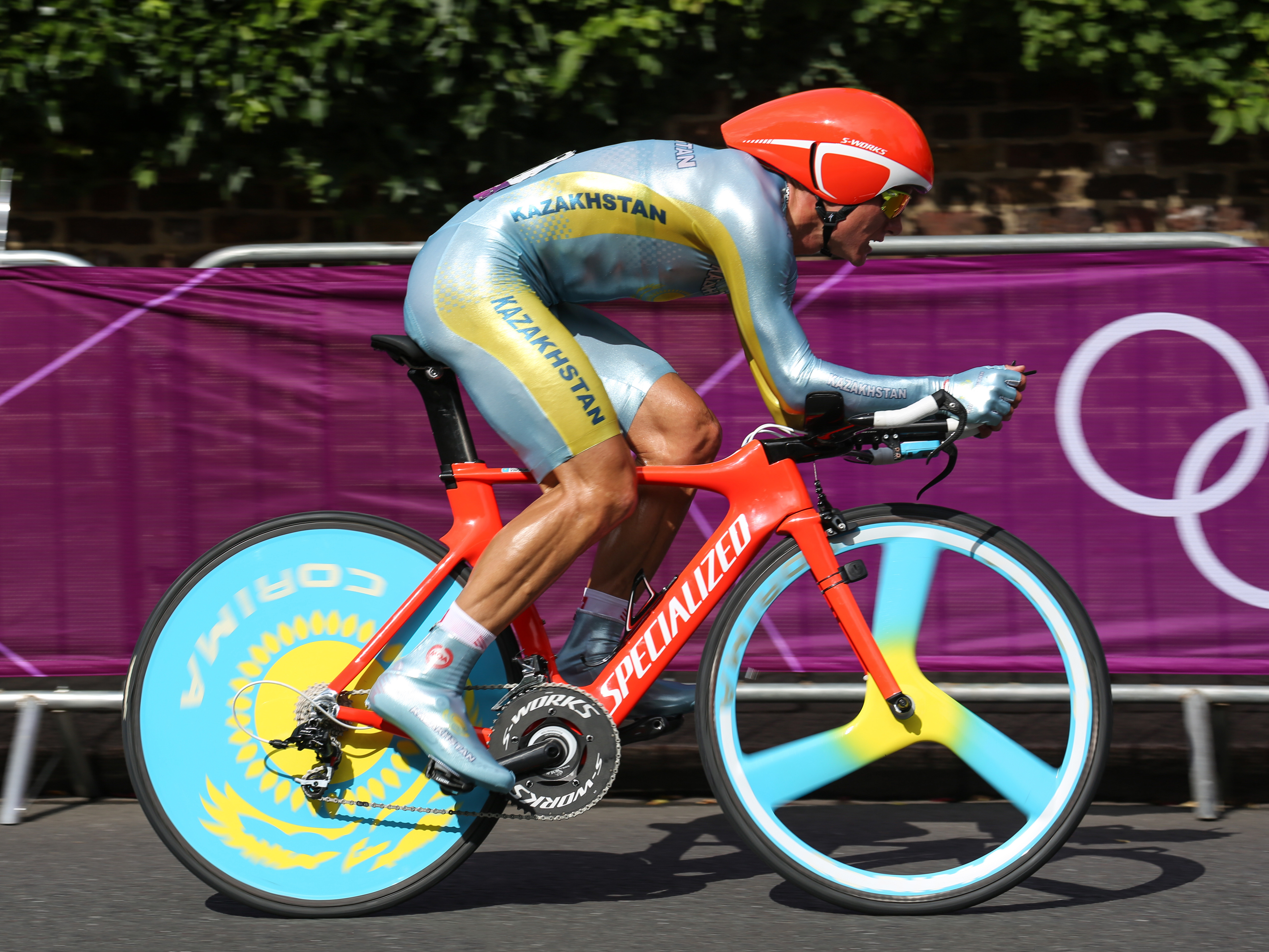
2012 London Olympics Time Trial

Cycling has been a discipline in the summer Olympics ever since the birth of the modern Olympic movement. Cycling activist, co-organizer of Peace Race, Włodzimierz Gołębiewski said: "Cycling has become a major event on the Olympic programme ... Like many other sports it has undergone several changes over the years. Just as there used to be track and field events such as the standing high jump or throwing the javelin with both hands, cyclists, too, used to compete for medals in events which today have been forgotten; for example in Athens in 1896, they attempted a 12-hour race, and in London, in 1908, one of the events was a sprint for 603.49 metres (659.98 yards)." The Olympic Games has never been as important in road cycling as in other sports. Until the distinction ended, the best riders were professionals rather than amateurs and so did not take part. Law enforcement always escort the athletes to ensure they are kept safe during the cycling events, especially the road races.

== International development and governance ==
The increase in organised cycle racing led to the development of national administrative bodies, in Great Britain in 1878, France 1881, the Netherlands 1883, Germany 1884 and Sweden 1900. Sometimes, as in Great Britain, cycling was originally administered as part of athletics, since cyclists often used the tracks used by runners. This, according to historian James McGurn, led to disputes within countries and internationally.

The Bicycle Union [of Britain], having quarrelled with the Amateur Athletic Association over cycle race jurisdiction on AAA premises, took issue with the Union Vélocipèdique de France over the French body's willingness to allow its "amateurs" to compete for prizes of up to 2,000 francs, the equivalent of about sixteen months' pay for a French manual worker.

The first international body was the International Cycling Association (ICA), established by an English schoolteacher named Henry Sturmey, the founder of Sturmey-Archer. It opened in 1893 and held its first world championship in Chicago, United States, the same year. A new organisation, the Union Cycliste Internationale (UCI), was set up on 15 April 1900 during the Olympic Games in Paris, by several European countries and the United States. Great Britain was not initially a member, but joined in 1903. The UCI, based in Switzerland, has run the sport ever since.

== Season ==
In its home in Europe and in the United States, cycle racing on the road is a summer sport, although the season can start in early spring and end in autumn. The months of the season depend on the hemisphere. A racing year is divided between lesser races, single-day classics and stage races. The classics include the Tour of Flanders, Paris–Roubaix and Milan–San Remo. The other important one-day race is the World Championships. Unlike other classics, the World Championships is held on a different course each year and ridden by national rather than sponsored teams. The winner wears a white jersey with bands of the UCI colors (blue, red, black, yellow, and green, often called "rainbow bands") around the chest.

In Australia, due to the relatively mild winters and hot summers, the amateur road racing season runs from autumn to spring, through the winter months, while criterium races are held in the mornings or late afternoons during the summer. Some professional events, including the Tour Down Under, are held in the southern summer, mainly to avoid clashing with the major northern hemisphere races and allowing top professionals to compete.

== Bicycle championships ==
- Olympic Games
- Commonwealth Games
- World Cycling Championship

== See also ==
- Outline of cycling
- List of important cycling events
- Glossary of cycling
