= RKM =

RKM or rkm can refer to:

- Ramakrishna Mission, Hindu religious organization
- Reichskommissariat Moskowien
- RKM, the ISO 639-3 code for the Marka language
- RKM, alias for Rulla Kelly-Mansell, in the Australian hip hop duo MLRN x RKM
- R.K.M & Ken-Y, a Puerto Rican reggaeton duo
- RKM code, for resistor and capacitor values
- Rotary Piston Machine (German Rotationskolbenmaschine)

== See also ==
- ŻKS ROW Rybnik, a Polish motorcycle club whose name was once RKM ROW Rybnik
