= HEHC =

HEHC is an abbreviation that can refer to, among others, the following:

- High-efficiency hybrid cycle – thermodynamic cycle
- High-Explosive, High-Capacity – military shell type
