= X-engine =

US engine manufacturer

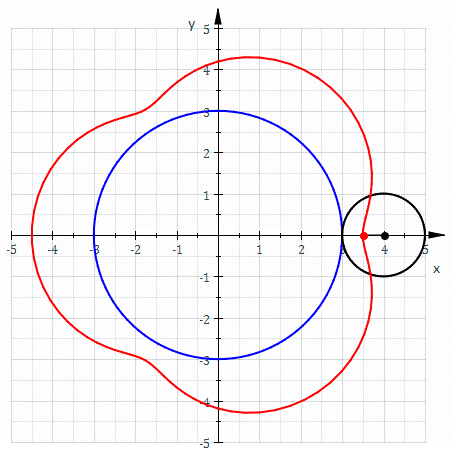
The red line is a three lobe epitrochoid, which is the shape of the LiquidPiston's swept volume

The X-engine is a type of pistonless rotary engine manufactured by LiquidPiston of Bloomfield, Connecticut. The core concept of the X engine is to invert the KKM Wankel design so the rotor is epitrochoidal instead of triangular, and the stationary housing is triangular instead of epitrochoidal. This provides several advantages such as moving the apex seals to the stationary housing (therefore improving sealing), LiquidPiston's patented HEHC, which most notably contains a natural Atkinson cycle, but without any of the complex linkages), and a high compression ratio whilst still retaining high power density.

== KKM Wankel engine ==
In the KKM-style Wankel engine (not to be confused with DKM Wankel engines where both the epitrochoidal housing and triangular rotor spin), the only successful mass-produced pistonless rotary engine to date, a figure-eight-like epitrochoid housing surrounds a curved sided triangular rotor. The rotor revolves around a fixed gear in a hula-hoop motion. The output shaft revolves at three times the speed of the rotor. One power pulse is delivered in one revolution of the output shaft. For comparison a single cylinder four-stroke piston engine delivers one power pulse for two rotations of the output shaft. The three operating chambers of the Wankel formed by the triangular rotor are separated by seals installed on the three apexes of the rotor. They require elaborate lubrication, and in older designs have been a weak point for the engine's durability.

== Design ==
The LiquidPiston design reverses the shapes: a figure-eight-shaped rotor moves within a triangular housing. The required seals (both face and apex) are mounted on the stationary housing, which simplifies lubrication. This makes it geometrically an inverted Wankel that operates on the high-efficiency hybrid cycle. Common to both concepts is the use of ports to supply air and remove exhaust gas, without the need for valves.

== Operating principle ==
This cycle consists of compressing air (with no fuel) to a very high ratio, as is typical in the Diesel cycle. The air is then isolated in a constant volume chamber. Fuel is directly injected and allowed to combust fully under constant volume conditions, similarly to Otto cycle combustion. Finally, the combustion products are expanded to atmospheric pressure, utilizing the Atkinson cycle.

== Variants ==
The X-Engine uses the Diesel cycle. Efficiency requires high compression ratios: typical diesel engines use between 15:1 and 24:1. The LiquidPiston engine was demonstrated with a compression ratio as high as 26:1. This generally rules out the use of lower-octane fuels like gasoline.

The X-Mini is a spark-ignited variant with lower compression. It is a 70 cc air-cooled, naturally aspirated, four-stroke X-Engine, and has been demonstrated using gasoline, kerosene, Jet A fuel, propane, and hydrogen.
