= Wave disk engine =

Pistonless internal-combustion engine

A wave disk engine or wave disk generator is a type of pistonless rotary engine being developed at Michigan State University and Warsaw Institute of Technology. The engine has a spinning disk with curved blades. Once fuel and air enter the engine, the rotation of the disk creates shockwaves that compress the mixture. When ignited, the burning mixture expands, pushing against the blades, causing them to spin. The spinning of the disk itself opens and closes intake and exhaust ports. The proposed concept was called a radial internal combustion wave rotor.

== Background ==
Wave rotors utilize shock waves to transfer energy between a high-energy fluid to a low-energy fluid, thereby increasing both temperature and pressure of the low-energy fluid (also called pressure wave machines or pressure exchangers). Numerical studies of wave-rotor constant-volume combustion channels have examined how interactions between shock waves and premixed flames affect flame wrinkling, flame surface area, and fuel-burning rates.

== Operational principles ==
As with all heat engines, the efficiency of a wave disk engine is governed by the temperature difference between the hot and cold sides (see Carnot's theorem). Compared to a conventional piston engine (reciprocating engine), a wave disk engine works at higher peak temperature, which theoretically makes it more efficient. The design also works without a cooling system, saving weight. Compared to turbine based systems, the rotational speed and the rotor-blade temperature of the wave disk engine is lower, which creates lower stress on materials, and consequently less demanding requirements for materials, leading to cheaper manufacturing and maintenance costs.

Earlier wave rotor implementations were mainly axial flow, where the scavenging process of returning hot compressed air back into the turbine is complex. The wave-disc engine uses a radial and circumferential flow, using centrifugal forces for scavenging. Curved channels provide greater length for the same disc diameter compared to straight channels, allowing the travel times of the waves to be tuned properly.

== Current status ==
The wave-disk engine has the potential for better energy efficiency compared to conventional internal combustion engine designs and can potentially save weight. Possible applications include charging batteries in hybrid vehicles, which could reduce weight by about 1,000 pounds (450 kg). It promises to be up to 60% more efficient, 30% lighter, and 30% cheaper to manufacture than an equivalent conventional piston engine, and to reduce emissions by 90%.

Michigan State University and Warsaw Institute of Technology researchers claim to have a prototype wave-disk engine and electricity generator that could replace current backup generator technology of plug-in electric hybrid vehicles. The research team is led by Associate Professor of Mechanical Engineering Norbert Müller and has been given $2.5 million funding from the United States Department of Energy's ARPA-E program. Müller's team hoped to have a vehicle-sized 25 kilowatt (33 hp) wave disc engine/generator ready by the end of 2011. As of January 2013, the project is looking into commercialization of the technology. Research continues at Columbia University in 2017 and at Michigan State University in 2012.

== See also ==
- Turboshaft
