= High-efficiency hybrid cycle =

The high-efficiency hybrid cycle (HEHC) is a new 4-stroke thermodynamic cycle combining elements of the Otto cycle, Diesel cycle, Atkinson cycle and Rankine cycle.

== HEHC engines ==
The 3rd generation design of the Liquidpiston Engine currently in development is the only engine currently designed around the HEHC. It is a rotary combustion engine.
