= RKM engine =

A simple RKM rotary engine

The Rotary Piston Machine (German: Rotationskolbenmaschine (RKM)) is a proposed (still in development) form of machine. It can be used either to transform pressure into rotational motion (an engine), or the converse - rotational motion into pressure (pump). It is still in development, but has possible applications in fields requiring oil, fuel or water pumps, as well as pumps for non-abrasive fluids when moderate or high pressure is required. For instance: Hydraulics, fluid and gas transport systems, presses, fuel injection, irrigation, heating systems, hydraulic lifts, water jet engines, hydro- and pneumatic engines, and medical pumps. The machine's inventor is Boris I. Schapiro, along with co-inventors Lev B. Levitin and Naum Kruk.

== Design ==
All versions of the RKM incorporate a working chamber formed by smoothly conjugated circular arcs. The piston, shaped to conform to the chamber's walls, "jumps" from wall to wall, thus performing a rotary motion. The piston has an appropriately shaped aperture fitted with a gear structure, and this drives the power shaft (or two power shafts in some models).

The piston, its aperture and the working chamber of the RKMs represent, in their cross sections, multi-oval figures which, mathematically, are related to the class of figures of equal width. Those multi-ovals are non-analytical figures with a discontinuous second derivative of the contour line (the curvature). Hence, generally speaking, the trajectories of their centers of curvature are also non-analytical and, within the RKMs' geometry, have to have singular points.

In relation to the piston, the trajectory of the power shaft axis has corner points, which correspond to extreme positions of the piston as related to the working chamber. Those corners, which represent singular points of the power shaft's trajectory, cannot be avoided or rounded to provide for the kinematically closed functioning of the gear.

The reason why until now the geometry of curves of constant width could not be put to practical use in the gear design is that no conventional gear structure with the regular rolling on of the gears would permit the exact rolling-on of the singularities. The RKMs solve this problem by introducing the inversely conjugated gear system, which makes it possible to have singular trajectories of the axes of rolling-on gears and, thus, allows the transfer of the angular momentum during the passage of the piston through its stop positions.

In simple words, the gear mechanism introduces corrections to the piston's motion, correcting the axis of rotation as it leaves the stop positions, so as to create a smooth motion.

=== Possible configurations ===
In theory, there is no limit to the number of "sides" that a working chamber may have. However, in practice, it is likely that configurations incorporating no more than seven arcs will be used.

In addition, there can be either one or two power shafts in the aperture in the center of the piston.

the exact configuration of every model depends upon its use. For instance, internal combustion engines would include injection valves and after-burning chambers. These, however, are not part of the RKM concept.

== Applications ==
Potential areas of application for the RKM engines include:

- Pumps: medium-, high-pressure, and pre-vacuum pumps for use in power machinery, refrigerators, elevators, lifts, cranes, road-building machinery, automobiles, aircraft, and other applications, including those for domestic water and heating systems, and scientific research.
- Compressors: medium- and high-pressure compressors for a wide range of industrial and consumer applications.
- "Cold" motors: hydraulic and pneumatic motors for use in automobiles, air-, space- and marine craft, and in a number of other applications in industrial and consumer products.
- Power tools: a new class of power tools for drilling, cutting and surface treatment of materials in various ranges (from super-large to micrometre).
- Internal and external combustion engines, including Diesel, for all types of wheeled or tracked motor vehicles (from motorbikes to automobiles and trucks, to Mars explorers), marine craft of all sizes (from pleasure boats to supertankers), helicopters and propeller-driven aircraft (including super-light platforms).
- Electric power generators for agriculture and industry, including oil and gas production, air & space industry, large stationary and vehicular power generators, compact emergency generators, etc.
- Compact sources of electrical power for portable computers and other electronic devices, etc.

One area where RKMs offer potential is in the pump market. RKM pumps can be at least as efficient than current conventional pump technologies, while offering overall advantages in pricing, size, reliability and energy efficiency.

== Comparison to the Wankel engine ==
Despite their apparent geometrical similarity, the RKM and the Wankel engine are quite different in design. The main similarities between them are the shape of the working chamber and the use of rotary motion.

However, there are many differences between the two. The Wankel engine working chamber is mobile while the RKM chamber is stationary. The axis of rotation in the Wankel engine moves in a circle while that of the RKM is fixed (in the single power shaft version, temporarily with two possible positions). In the RKM motor, the ignition takes place in a compact recess, while the Wankel's is in the work chamber itself. The RKM's sealing elements are in surface contact with the work chamber and pistons, as opposed to the Wankel's line contact. This makes for a number of advantages of the RKM motor over the Wankel:

1. Easier adaptation to diesel fuel.
2. Support of forced afterburning of gases, which is not feasible with the Wankel geometry.
3. Longer life, lower fuel consumption and higher efficiency.

One application that the two may indeed have in common is miniaturization. A miniature Wankel engine has been successfully constructed, and it stands to reason that the same can be done for an RKM.

Although developed in the 1960s, today there are no runnable RKM engine demonstrated.

== See also ==
- Pistonless rotary engine
