= Race clock =

Timing device for sports events

A race clock (also called a display clock) is sports equipment with an alpha numeric display that typically shows the elapsed time for a race or sporting event.

A race clock may be positioned at the finish line of a race or at various key intermediate locations (split points) so that athletes will know their pace. The display is typically either light emitting diodes or plastic elements that can be flipped to reveal or hide a surface painted with a bright color. The digits on a race clock vary in size from 6 inches to a foot in height. The clock can be either a free standing piece of equipment on a tripod or finish truss or can be incorporated into a larger scoreboard display.
