= Pistonless rotary engine =

Internal combustion engine

Libralato engine

A pistonless rotary engine is an internal combustion engine that does not use reciprocating pistons in the way a reciprocating engine does, but it still relies on the same distinct induction, compression, ignition, exhaust phases and the same enclosed volumes and gas pressure increase due to combustion to generate power. Designs vary widely but typically involve one or more rotors, sometimes called rotary pistons, as described in QT-Wankel: Two Concepts 100 Years Apart. Although many different designs have been constructed, only the Wankel engine has achieved widespread adoption.

The term rotary combustion engine has been used as a name for these engines to distinguish them from early (generally up to the early 1920s) aircraft engines and motorcycle engines also known as rotary engines which have radially disposed cylinders which rotate around a stationary crankshaft (the "pistonless" prefix also distinguishes these typical rotary engines from the birotary engine which also contains pistons, despite them being inside the stationary housing). However, all of them continue to be called rotary engines and only the context determines which type is meant, whereas the "pistonless" prefix is less ambiguous. Gas-turbine engines can also be described as rotary combustion engines. Their practical applications include helicopter rotor drive. During the 1950s gas turbines were considered to be a viable option for road cars and a number of prototypes were built by various manufacturers, one of the first being the Rover JET1 but poor fuel efficiency, high noise levels, poor drivability and other issues prevented their use.

== Pistonless rotary engines ==
A pistonless rotary engine replaces the linear reciprocating motion of a piston with a generally rotary and sometimes more complex compression/expansion mechanism with the objective of improving some aspect of the engine's operation, such as: higher efficiency thermodynamic cycles, reduced physical size and weight, lower mechanical stress, lower vibration, higher compression, or less mechanical complexity. As of 2006 the Wankel engine is the only successful pistonless rotary engine, but many similar concepts have been proposed and are under various stages of development. Examples of rotary engines include:

Production stage

- Wankel engine
- LiquidPiston engine

Development stage

- Engineair engine
- Hamilton Walker engines
- Libralato rotary Atkinson cycle engine
- Nutating disc engine
- RKM engine, German: RotationsKolbenMaschine
- Sarich orbital engine
- Swing-piston engine, Trochilic
- Wave disk engine
- MotoTurbine Radiale, Vene Pump Engine, Jean Claude Lefeuvre

Conceptual stage

- Gerotor engine
- Internally Radiating Impulse Structure: IRIS engine

== See also ==
- Range extender (vehicle)
