= Magnetic coupling =

Component transferring torque between shafts

A magnetic coupling is a component which transfers torque from one shaft to another using a magnetic field, rather than a physical mechanical connection. They are also known as magnetic drive couplings, magnetic shaft couplings, or magnetic disc couplings.

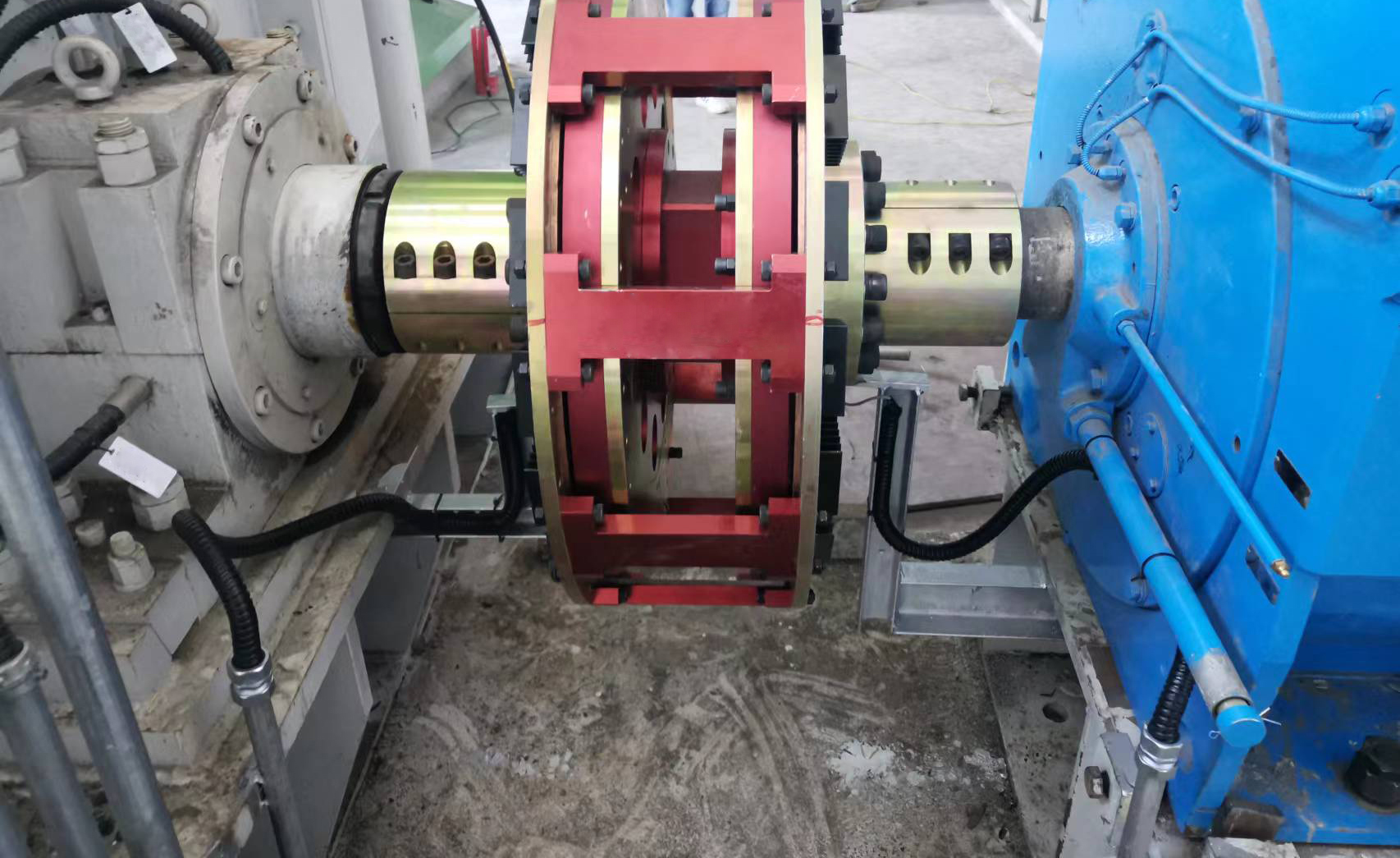
Magnetic coupling

Magnetic couplings allow a physical separation between input and output shafts, precluding the use of shaft seals, which eventually wear out and fail from the sliding of two surfaces against each another. Magnetic couplings are also used for ease of maintenance on systems that require precise alignment, since they allow a greater off-axis error between the motor and driven shaft than physical couplings.

Magnetic couplings are most often used for liquid pumps, propeller systems, mine motors, conveyor belt motors and kiln elevators.

== Applications ==
Some diver propulsion vehicles and remotely operated underwater vehicles use magnetic couplings to transfer torque from the electric motor to the prop. Magnetic gearing is also being explored for use in utility-scale wind turbines as a means of enhancing reliability. The magnetic coupling has several advantages over a traditional stuffing box.

Some aquariums use magnetic drive pumps, which have a magnetic coupling between the motor on the dry side of an aquarium wall and the propeller or impeller in the water on the other side of the wall. This coupling features two face-to-face magnetized disks: the driving magnet on the dry side, and the driven magnet on the underwater side. Torque is transferred by shear forces between the attracting magnetic disks, but this attraction can also produce an axial load as the disks pull on each other. There are two main designs for the magnetic pattern on each disk. One design minimizes the axial load by counterbalancing a magnetically attractive section with a magnetically repulsive section near the axis. The other design maximizes torque and resists the consequential axial load with a mechanical thrust bearing.

A magnetic stirrer is another example of magnetic coupling.

Magnetic couplings are often synchronous, meaning the output shaft speed equals input shaft speed (a 1:1 ratio).

The first few gears in the geartrain of an Omega Megasonic wristwatch have no teeth; instead, magnetic north and south poles on neighboring gears act like the teeth and trough of spur gears, allowing each gear to drive the next gear in the chain. Such magnetic gears, like spur gears, always have gear ratios consisting of small integers.

More sophisticated magnetic gearings use pole pieces to modulate the magnetic field. They can be designed to have gear ratios from 1.01:1 to 1000:1.

== Features ==
Magnetic couplings have some notable properties:

=== No vibration ===
Because there is no contact between the active part and the driven part of a magnetic coupling, and there is no rigid connection problem. Sudden changes and vibrations are not directly transferred across the coupling. Therefore, it can avoid the transmission of vibration, resulting in smoother mechanical operation.

=== Overload protection ===
Magnetic couplings offer protection against overload during operation. If the load on the driven component becomes too large, the two parts may slip out of sync and end the transmission of torque. This avoids damage to the system, protecting both the motor from excessive loads and the driven component from deformation.

=== Easy maintenance ===
A magnetic coupling transmission device is relatively simple in structure, and there is a gap between the driving part and the driven part, which is easy to install, disassemble, troubleshoot, and maintain.

=== Easy power transmission ===
Magnetic couplings can transmit power via a linear motion, rotary motion, or helical compound motion (a combination of linear motion and rotary motion). The combination of these transmission methods and different mechanical geometry can realize a wide variety of orderly motion in three-dimensional space.

=== Safety ===
Because magnetic couplings do not penetrate the surface they operate across, pumps that use this type of coupling can completely avoid leakage. This is particularly important if the pumped fluid or gas is corrosive, toxic, flammable, explosive, acidic, alkaline, or otherwise harmful. This makes magnetic coupling transmission technology especially applicable in the production of petroleum, chemicals, and pharmaceuticals, and in the industries of offshore oil well operations, non-ferrous metal smelting, wet mineral processing, and food processing.

== See also ==
- Electromagnetic clutch
- Magnetic particle clutch
