= Regenerative braking =

Energy recovery mechanism

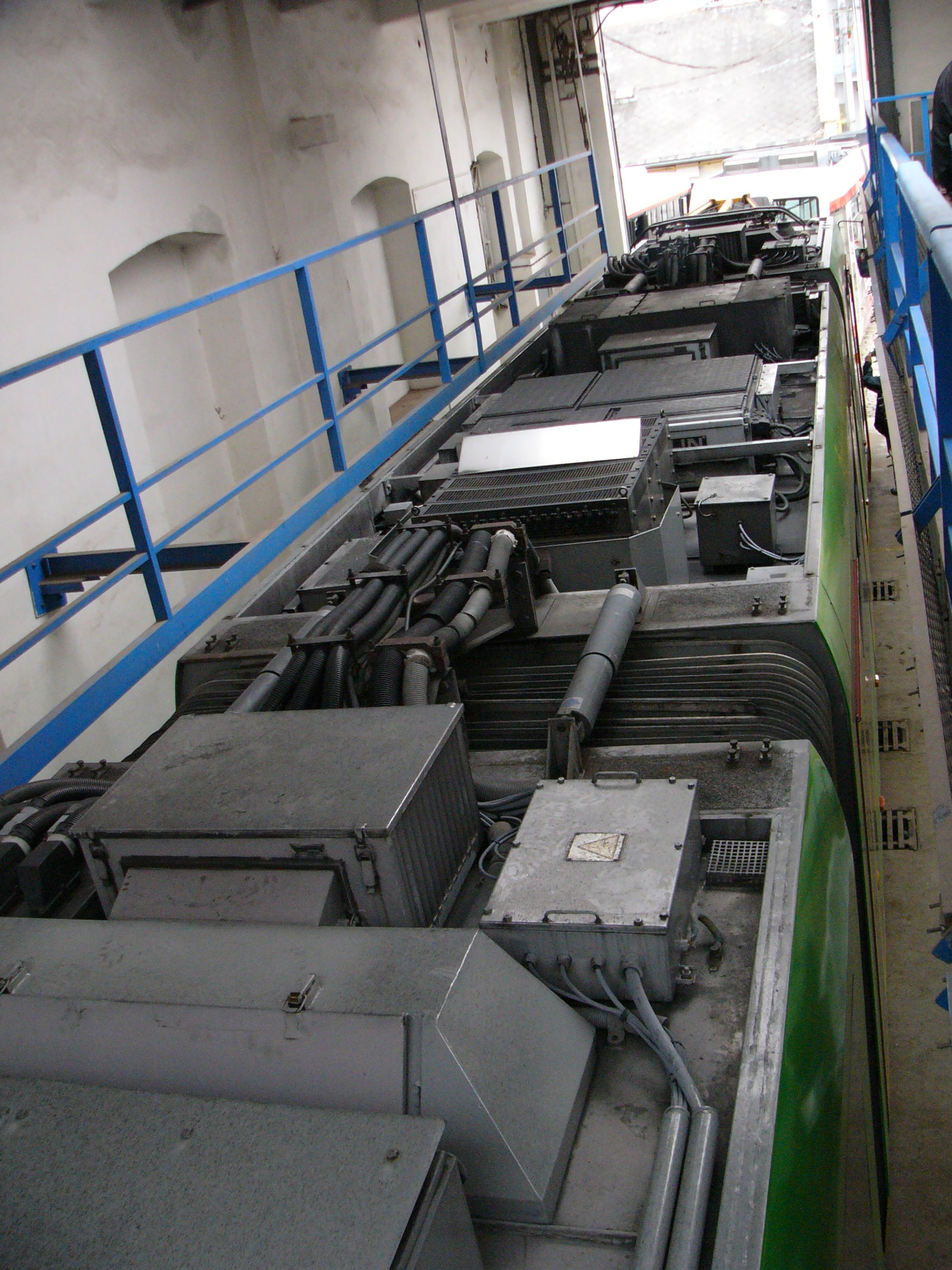
Mechanism for regenerative brake on the roof of a Škoda Astra tram

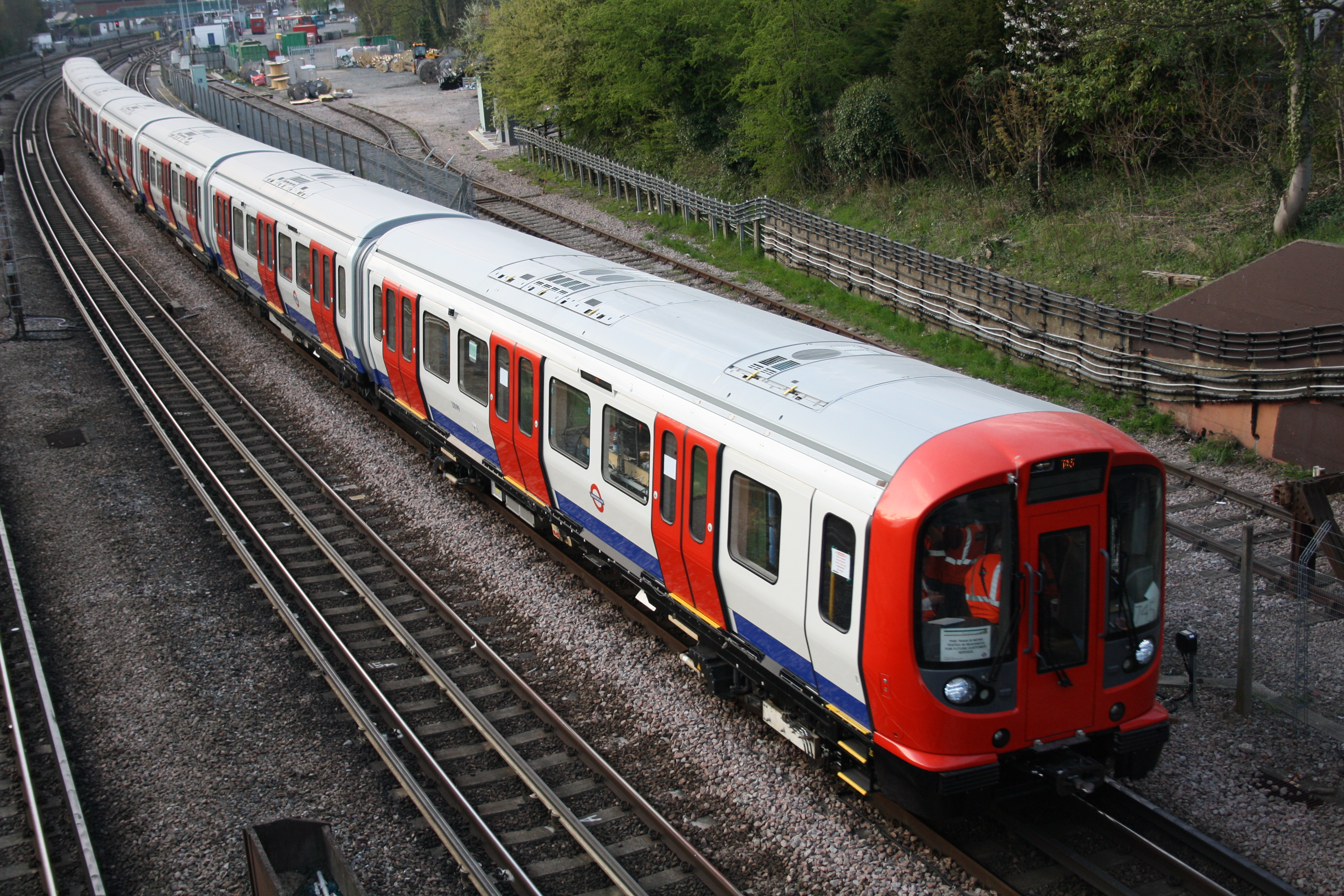
The S7/8 Stock on the London Underground can return around 20% of its energy usage to the power supply.

Regenerative braking is an energy recovery mechanism that slows down a moving vehicle or object by converting its kinetic energy or potential energy into a form that can be either used immediately or stored until needed.

Typically, regenerative brakes work by driving an electric motor in reverse to recapture energy that would otherwise be lost as heat during braking, effectively turning the traction motor into an electric generator. Feeding power backwards through the system like this allows the energy harvested from deceleration to resupply an energy storage solution such as a battery or a capacitor. Once stored, this power can then later be used again to aid propulsion. Because of the electrified vehicle architecture required for such a braking system, automotive regenerative brakes are most commonly found on hybrid and electric vehicles.

This method contrasts with conventional braking systems, where excess kinetic energy is converted to unwanted and wasted heat due to friction in the brakes. Similarly, with rheostatic brakes, energy is recovered by using electric motors as generators but is immediately dissipated as heat in resistors.

In addition to improving the overall efficiency of the vehicle, regeneration can significantly extend the life of the braking system. This is because the traditional mechanical parts like discs, calipers, and pads – included for when regenerative braking alone is insufficient to safely stop the vehicle – will not wear out as quickly as they would in a vehicle relying solely on traditional brakes.

== General principle ==
The most common form of regenerative brake involves an electric motor functioning as an electric generator. In electric railways, the electricity generated is fed back into the traction power supply. In battery electric and hybrid electric vehicles, the energy is stored chemically in a battery, electrically in a bank of capacitors, or mechanically in a rotating flywheel. Hydraulic hybrid vehicles use hydraulic motors to store energy in the form of compressed air. In a hydrogen fuel cell powered vehicle, the electrical energy generated by the motor is stored chemically in a battery, similar to battery and hybrid electric vehicles.

=== Practical regenerative braking ===
Regenerative braking is not by itself sufficient as the sole means of safely bringing a vehicle to a standstill, or slowing it as required, so it must be used in conjunction with another braking system such as friction-based braking.

- The regenerative braking effect drops off at lower speeds and cannot bring a vehicle to a complete halt reasonably quickly with current technology. However, some cars, like the Chevrolet Bolt, can bring the vehicle to a complete stop on level surfaces when the driver knows the vehicle's regenerative braking distance. This is referred to as one-pedal driving (OPD).
- Some current regenerative brakes do not immobilize a stationary vehicle; physical locking is required, for example, to prevent vehicles from rolling down hills. Some cars, like the Chevrolet Bolt, can remain stationary on small slopes using only the motor.
- Many road vehicles with regenerative braking do not have drive motors on all wheels (as in a two-wheel drive car); regenerative braking is normally only applicable to wheels with motors. For safety, the ability to brake all wheels is required.
- The regenerative braking effect available is limited, and mechanical braking is still necessary for substantial speed reductions or to bring a vehicle to a stop.
- On steep hills with real traffic speeds, the magnitude of potential energy recoverable during the descent of a vehicle at a slower speed than its terminal speed is substantially greater than that recoverable by bringing the vehicle from even the terminal speed to a complete stop. An example used by bicyclists is that during the descent of a hill, approximately three hair dryers' worth of power or some two horsepower is lost to air drag at terminal speeds.

Regenerative and friction braking must both be used, creating the need to control them to produce the required total braking. The GM EV-1 was the first commercial car to do this. In 1997 and 1998, engineers Abraham Farag and Loren Majersik were issued two patents for this brake-by-wire technology.

Early applications commonly suffered from a serious safety hazard: in many early electric vehicles with regenerative braking, the same controller positions were used to apply power and to apply the regenerative brake, with the functions being swapped by a separate manual switch. This led to a number of serious accidents when drivers accidentally accelerated when intending to brake, such as the runaway train accident in Wädenswil, Switzerland in 1948, which killed twenty-one people.

In the 2020s, most vehicles equipped with regenerative braking can completely halt reasonably quickly in one-pedal driving mode. Some car models do not illuminate the braking light when engaging in regenerative braking, leading to safety concerns. Most regulations do not mandate the illumination of a braking light when the vehicle decelerates through regenerative braking. The one-pedal driving (OPD) mode also leads to concerns over sudden unintended acceleration (SUA), as the driver could confuse the accelerator as the brake in stressful situations when the latter is seldomly used during OPD operation. The GB 21670-2025 vehicle standard later mandated that brake lights must turn on during regenerative braking when deceleration exceeds 1.3 m/s^{2}.

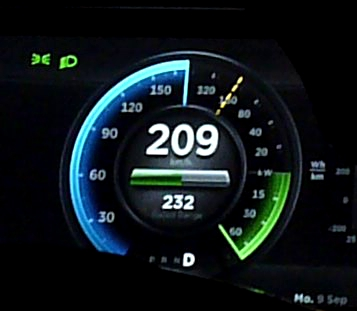
A Tesla Model S P85+ recovering regenerative braking power in excess of 60 kW. During regenerative braking the power indicator is green.

== History ==
In 1886 the Sprague Electric Railway & Motor Company, founded by Frank J. Sprague, introduced two important inventions: a constant-speed, non-sparking motor with fixed brushes, and regenerative braking.

Early examples of this system in road vehicles were the front-wheel drive conversions of horse-drawn cabs by Louis Antoine Krieger in Paris in the 1890s. The Krieger electric landaulet had a drive motor in each front wheel with a second set of parallel windings (bifilar coil) for regenerative braking. The Orwell Electric Truck introduced by Ransomes, Sims & Jefferies in England during WW1 used regenerative braking switched in by the driver.

In England, "automatic regenerative control" was introduced to tramway operators by John S. Raworth's Traction Patents 1903–1908, offering them economic and operational benefits as explained in some detail by his son Alfred Raworth. These included tramway systems at Devonport (1903), Rawtenstall, Birmingham, Crystal Palace-Croydon (1906), and many others. Slowing the speed of the cars or keeping it in control on descending gradients, the motors worked as generators and braked the vehicles. The tram cars also had wheel brakes and track slipper brakes which could stop the tram should the electric braking systems fail. In several cases the tram car motors were shunt wound instead of series wound, and the systems on the Crystal Palace line utilized series-parallel controllers. Following a serious accident at Rawtenstall, an embargo was placed on this form of traction in 1911; the regenerative braking system was reintroduced twenty years later.

Regenerative braking has been in extensive use on railways for many decades. The Baku-Tbilisi-Batumi railway (Transcaucasus Railway or Georgian railway) started utilizing regenerative braking in the early 1930s. This was especially effective on the steep and dangerous Surami Pass. In Scandinavia the Kiruna to Narvik electrified railway, known as Malmbanan on the Swedish side and Ofoten Line on the Norwegian, carries iron ore on the steeply-graded route from the mines in Kiruna, in the north of Sweden, down to the port of Narvik in Norway to this day. The rail cars are full of thousands of tons of iron ore on the way down to Narvik, and these trains generate large amounts of electricity by regenerative braking, with a maximum recuperative braking force of 750 kN. From Riksgränsen on the national border to the Port of Narvik, the trains use only a fifth of the power they regenerate. The regenerated energy is sufficient to power the empty trains back up to the national border. Any excess energy from the railway is pumped into the power grid to supply homes and businesses in the region, and the railway is a net generator of electricity.

Electric cars used regenerative braking since the earliest experiments, but this initially required the driver to flip switches between various operational modes in order to use it. The Baker Electric Runabout and the Owen Magnetic were early examples, which used many switches and modes controlled by an expensive "black box" or "drum switch" as part of their electrical system. These, like the Krieger design, could only practically be used on downhill portions of a trip, and had to be manually engaged.

Improvements in electronics allowed this process to be fully automated, starting with 1967's AMC Amitron experimental electric car. Designed by Gulton Industries the motor controller automatically began battery charging when the brake pedal was applied. Many modern hybrid and electric vehicles use this technique to extend the range of the battery pack, especially those using an AC drive train (most earlier designs used DC power).

An AC/DC rectifier and a very large capacitor may be used to store the regenerated energy, rather than a battery. The use of a capacitor allows much more rapid peak storage of energy, and at higher voltages. Mazda used this system in some 2018 cars, where it is branded i-ELOOP.

== Electric railways ==
During braking, the traction motor connections are altered to turn them into electrical generators. The motor fields are connected across the main traction generator (MG) and the motor armatures are connected across the load. The MG now excites the motor fields. The rolling locomotive or multiple unit wheels turn the motor armatures, and the motors act as generators, either sending the generated current through onboard resistors (dynamic braking) or back into the supply (regenerative braking). Compared to electro-pneumatic friction brakes, braking with the traction motors can be regulated faster improving the performance of wheel slide protection.

For a given direction of travel, current flow through the motor armatures during braking will be opposite to that during motoring. Therefore, the motor exerts torque in a direction that is opposite from the rolling direction.

Braking effort is proportional to the product of the magnetic strength of the field windings, multiplied by that of the armature windings.

Savings of 17%, and less wear on friction braking components, are claimed for British Rail Class 390s. Caltrain claims 23% of the energy used by its Stadler KISS electric trains are recaptured and returned to the grid. The Delhi Metro reduced the amount of carbon dioxide (CO_{2}) released into the atmosphere by around 90,000 tons by regenerating 112,500 megawatt hours of electricity through the use of regenerative braking systems between 2004 and 2007. It was expected that the Delhi Metro would reduce its emissions by over 100,000 tons of CO_{2} per year once its phase II was complete, through the use of regenerative braking.

Electricity generated by regenerative braking may be fed back into the traction power supply; either offset against other electrical demand on the network at that instant, used for head end power loads, or stored in lineside storage systems for later use.

A form of what can be described as regenerative braking is used on some parts of the London Underground, achieved by having small slopes leading up and down from stations. The train is slowed by the climb, and then leaves down a slope, so kinetic energy is converted to gravitational potential energy in the station. This is normally found on the deep tunnel sections of the network and not generally above ground or on the cut and cover sections of the Metropolitan and District Lines.

== Comparison of dynamic and regenerative brakes ==
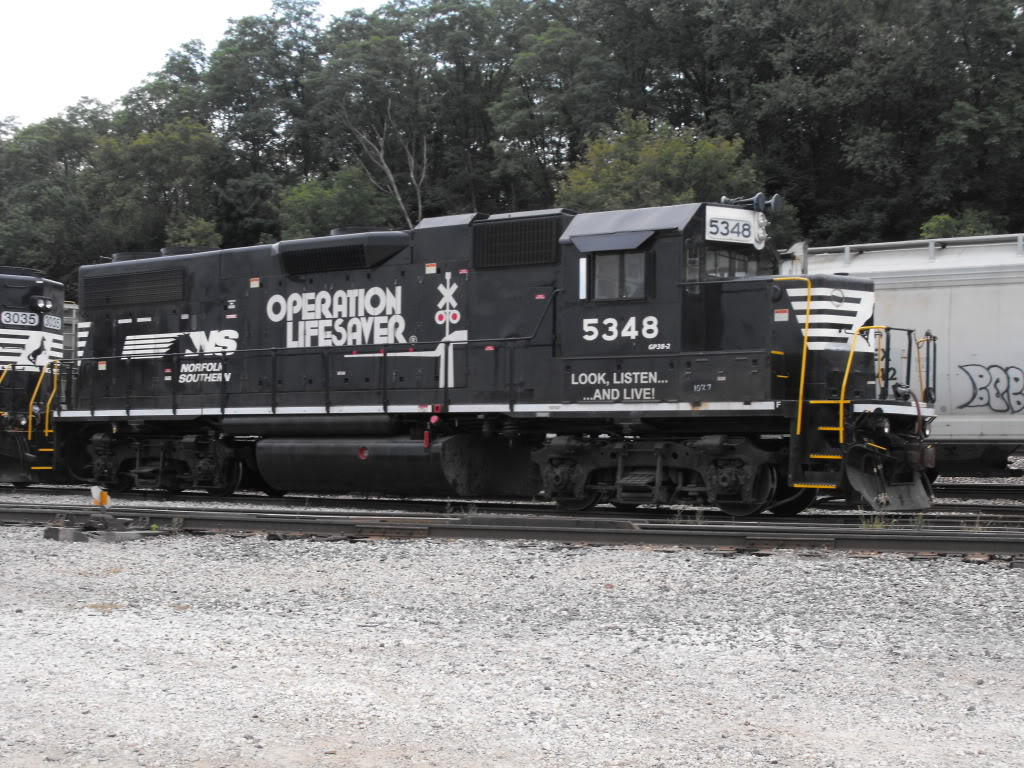
The box extending sideways from the roof directly over the word "operation" allows air to freely flow through the resistors of the dynamic brakes on this diesel-electric locomotive.

What are described as dynamic brakes ("rheostatic brakes" in British English) on electric traction systems, unlike regenerative brakes, dissipate electric energy as heat rather than using it, by passing the current through large banks of resistors. Vehicles that use dynamic brakes include forklift trucks, diesel-electric locomotives, and trams. This heat can be used to warm the vehicle interior, or dissipated externally by large radiator-like cowls to house the resistor banks.

General Electric's experimental 1936 steam turbine locomotives featured true regeneration. These two locomotives ran the steam water over the resistor packs, as opposed to air cooling used in most dynamic brakes. This energy displaced the oil normally burned to keep the water hot, and thereby recovered energy that could be used to accelerate again.

The main disadvantage of regenerative brakes when compared with dynamic brakes is the need to closely match the generated current with the supply characteristics and increased maintenance cost of the lines. With DC supplies, this requires that the voltage be closely controlled. The AC power supply and frequency converter pioneer Miro Zorič and his first AC power electronics have also enabled this to be possible with AC supplies. The supply frequency must also be matched (this mainly applies to locomotives where an AC supply is rectified for DC motors).

In areas where there is a constant need for power unrelated to moving the vehicle, such as electric train heat or air conditioning, this load requirement can be utilized as a sink for the recovered energy via modern AC traction systems. This method has become popular with North American passenger railroads where head end power loads are typically in the area of 500 kW year round. Using HEP loads in this way has prompted recent electric locomotive designs such as the ALP-46 and ACS-64 to eliminate the use of dynamic brake resistor grids and also eliminates any need for any external power infrastructure to accommodate power recovery allowing self-powered vehicles to employ regenerative braking as well.

A small number of steep grade railways have used 3-phase power supplies and induction motors. This results in a near constant speed for all trains, as the motors rotate with the supply frequency both when driving and braking.

== Kinetic energy recovery systems ==
Kinetic energy recovery systems (KERS) were used for the motor sport Formula One's 2009 season, and are under development for road vehicles. KERS was abandoned for the 2010 Formula One season, but re-introduced for the 2011 season. By 2013, all teams were using KERS with Marussia F1 starting use for the 2013 season. One of the main reasons that not all cars used KERS immediately is because it raises the car's center of gravity, and reduces the amount of ballast that is available to balance the car so that it is more predictable when turning. FIA rules also limit the exploitation of the system. The concept of transferring the vehicle's kinetic energy using flywheel energy storage was postulated by physicist Richard Feynman in the 1950s and is exemplified in such systems as the Zytek, Flybrid, Torotrak and Xtrac used in F1. Differential based systems also exist such as the Cambridge Passenger/Commercial Vehicle Kinetic Energy Recovery System (CPC-KERS).

Xtrac and Flybrid are both licensees of Torotrak's technologies, which employ a small and sophisticated ancillary gearbox incorporating a continuously variable transmission (CVT). The CPC-KERS is similar as it also forms part of the driveline assembly. However, the whole mechanism including the flywheel sits entirely in the vehicle's hub (looking like a drum brake). In the CPC-KERS, a differential replaces the CVT and transfers torque between the flywheel, drive wheel and road wheel.

== Motor sports ==
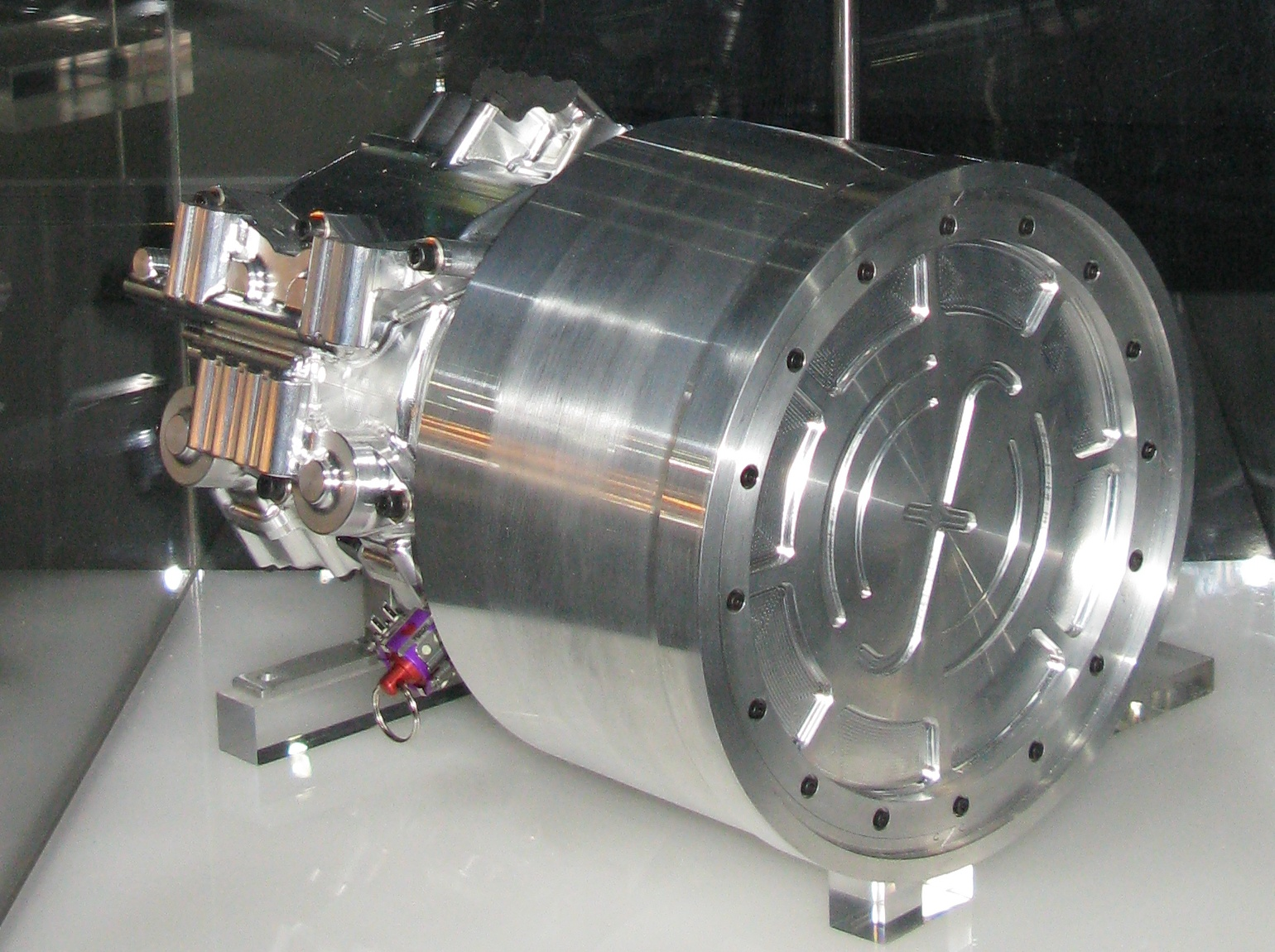
A Flybrid Systems kinetic energy recovery system

The first of these systems to be revealed was the Flybrid. This system weighs 24 kg and has an energy capacity of 400 kJ after allowing for internal losses. A maximum power boost of 60 kW (82 PS; 80 hp) for 6.67 seconds is available. The 240 mm diameter flywheel weighs 5.0 kg and revolves at up to 64,500 rpm. Maximum torque is 18 Nm (13.3 ftlbs). The system occupies a volume of 13 litres.

=== Formula One ===
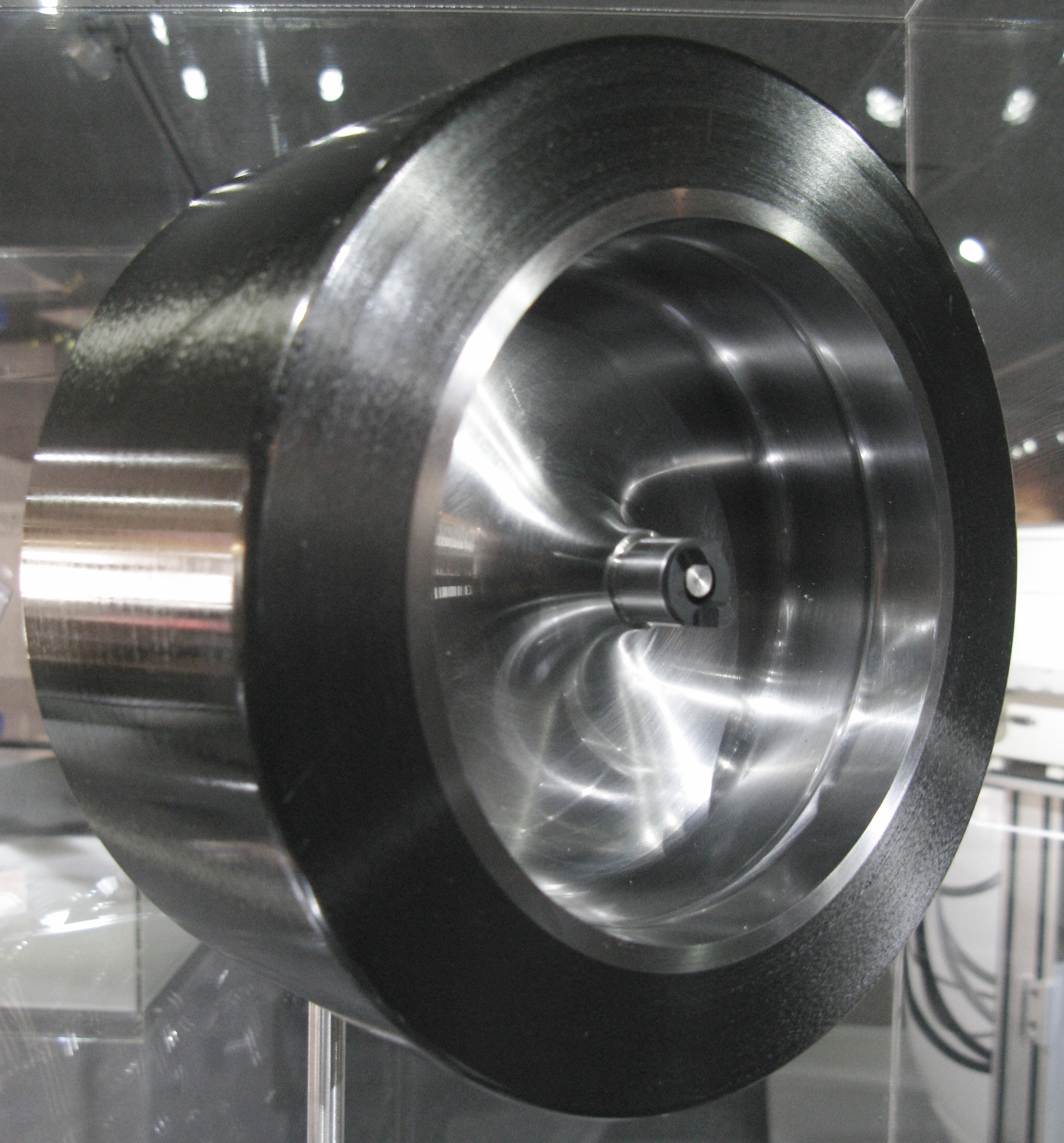
A KERS flywheel

Formula One have stated that they support responsible solutions to the world's environmental challenges, and the FIA allowed the use of 60 kW (82 PS; 80 hp) KERS in the regulations for the 2009 Formula One season. Teams began testing systems in 2008: energy can either be stored as mechanical energy (as in a flywheel) or as electrical energy (as in a battery or supercapacitor).

Prior to the introduction of KERS, McLaren had already deployed an early regenerative braking system in their 1998 MP4/13 race car. This system didn't send power to the wheels directly, and instead used energy from the brakes to run auxiliary pumps on the engine to combat parasitic losses, resulting in an extra 30 to 40 horsepower for a limited period.

Two minor incidents were reported during testing of KERS systems in 2008. The first occurred when the Red Bull Racing team tested their KERS battery for the first time in July: it malfunctioned and caused a fire scare that led to the team's factory being evacuated. The second was less than a week later when a BMW Sauber mechanic was given an electric shock when he touched Christian Klien's KERS-equipped car during a test at the Jerez circuit.

With the introduction of KERS in the 2009 season, four teams used it at some point in the season: Ferrari, Renault, BMW, and McLaren. During the season, Renault and BMW stopped using the system. McLaren Mercedes became the first team to win a F1 GP using a KERS equipped car when Lewis Hamilton won the 2009 Hungarian Grand Prix on 26 July 2009. Their second KERS equipped car finished fifth. At the following race, Lewis Hamilton became the first driver to take pole position with a KERS car, his teammate, Heikki Kovalainen qualifying second. This was also the first instance of an all KERS front row. On 30 August 2009, Kimi Räikkönen won the Belgian Grand Prix with his KERS equipped Ferrari. It was the first time that KERS contributed directly to a race victory, with second placed Giancarlo Fisichella claiming "Actually, I was quicker than Kimi. He only took me because of KERS at the beginning".

Although KERS was still legal in Formula 1 in the 2010 season, all the teams had agreed not to use it. New rules for the 2011 F1 season which raised the minimum weight limit of the car and driver by 20 kg to 640 kg, along with the FOTA teams agreeing to the use of KERS devices once more, meant that KERS returned for the 2011 season. This is still optional as it was in the 2009 season; in the 2011 season 3 teams elected not to use it. For the 2012 season, only Marussia and HRT raced without KERS, and by 2013, with the withdrawal of HRT, all 11 teams on the grid were running KERS.

In the 2014 season, the power output of the MGU-K (The replacement of the KERS and part of the ERS system that also includes a turbocharger waste heat recovery system) was increased from 60 kW to 120 kW and it was allowed to recover 2 mega- joules per lap. This was to balance the sport's move from 2.4-litre V8 engines to 1.6-litre V6 engines. The fail-safe settings of the brake-by-wire system that now supplements KERS came under examination as a contributing factor in the fatal crash of Jules Bianchi at the 2014 Japanese Grand Prix.

=== Autopart makers ===
Bosch Motorsport Service is developing a KERS for use in motor racing. These electricity storage systems for hybrid and engine functions include a lithium-ion battery with scalable capacity or a flywheel, a four to eight kilogram electric motor (with a maximum power level of 60 kW or 80 hp), as well as the KERS controller for power and battery management. Bosch also offers a range of electric hybrid systems for commercial and light-duty applications.

=== Car makers ===
Automakers including Honda have been testing KERS systems. At the 2008 1,000 km of Silverstone, Peugeot Sport unveiled the Peugeot 908 HY, a hybrid electric variant of the diesel 908, with KERS. Peugeot planned to campaign the car in the 2009 Le Mans Series season, although it was not capable of scoring championship points. Peugeot plans also a compressed air regenerative braking powertrain called Hybrid Air.

McLaren began testing of their KERS in September 2008 at the Jerez test track in preparation for the 2009 F1 season, although at that time it was not yet known if they would be operating an electrical or mechanical system. In November 2008 it was announced that Freescale Semiconductor would collaborate with McLaren Electronic Systems to further develop its KERS for McLaren's Formula One car from 2010 onwards. Both parties believed this collaboration would improve McLaren's KERS system and help the system filter down to road car technology.

Toyota has used a supercapacitor for regeneration on a Supra HV-R hybrid race car that won the Tokachi 24 Hours race in July 2007.

BMW has used regenerative braking on their E90 3 Series as well as in current models like F25 5 Series under the EfficientDynamics moniker. Volkswagen have regenerative braking technologies under the BlueMotion brand in such models as the Volkswagen Golf Mk7 and Mk7 Golf Estate / Wagon models, other VW group brands like SEAT, Skoda and Audi.

=== Motorcycles ===
KTM racing boss Harald Bartol has revealed that the factory raced with a secret kinetic energy recovery system (KERS) fitted to Tommy Koyama's motorcycle during the 2008 season-ending 125cc Valencian Grand Prix. This was against the rules, so they were banned from doing it afterwards.

=== Races ===
Automobile Club de l'Ouest, the organizer behind the annual 24 Hours of Le Mans event and the Le Mans Series, was "studying specific rules for LMP1 that will be equipped with a kinetic energy recovery system" in 2007. Peugeot was the first manufacturer to unveil a fully functioning LMP1 car in the form of the 908 HY at the 2008 Autosport 1000 km race at Silverstone.

== Civilian transport ==
=== Bicycles ===
On electric bicycles, regenerative braking can be used in principle. However, as of 2024 it is rarely used on bicycles, mainly because it requires a direct-drive hub motor (while many bicycles use a mid-drive motor which drives the chain), and because it cannot be combined with a freewheel mechanism. Also, the amount of energy regenerated is typically too low to be worthwhile.

Regenerative braking is also possible on a non-electric bicycle. The United States Environmental Protection Agency, working with students from the University of Michigan, developed the hydraulic Regenerative Brake Launch Assist (RBLA).

=== Motorcycles ===
Electric motorcycles can utilise regenerative braking in different ways, whether it is a hub motor or a mid-drive motor, as motorcycles don't need a freewheel mechanism like bicycles do. Some motorcycles utilise dedicated throttles/levers to control the regenerative brake (sometimes called "analog regen" on inverters such as Kelly KLS), whereas others rely on a "passive" method, where it activates when the propulsion throttle is let go, rather than coasting. These systems usually have adjustable/programmable power levels.

=== Cars ===
In general, it has been found that regenerative braking can recapture around half of the energy that is lost when a car brakes, which translates to a 10-25% efficiency gain.Many hybrid electric and fully electric vehicles employ regenerative braking in conjunction with friction braking, Regenerative braking systems (RBS) are not able to fully emulate conventional brake function for drivers, but there are continuing advancements. The calibrations used to determine when energy will be regenerated and when friction braking is used to slow down the vehicle affects the way the driver feels the braking action.

The RBS is a key mechanism for electric vehicles to obtain braking energy. This technology seriously affects the economy, emissions, safety and other functions of electric vehicles. By improving the RBS, the kinetic energy recovery rate of the vehicle can be significantly increased, and the driving stability of the vehicle can be improved.

=== Streetcars/trams ===
Power consumption is reduced by regenerative braking on streetcars (AE) or trams (CE) in Oranjestad, Aruba. Designed and built by TIG/m Modern Street Railways in Chatsworth, USA, the vehicles use hybrid/electric technology: they do not take their power from external sources such as overhead wires when running but are self-powered by lithium batteries augmented by hydrogen fuel cells.

== Thermodynamics ==
=== KERS flywheel ===
The energy of a flywheel can be described by this general energy equation, assuming the flywheel is the system:

$$E_\text{in}-E_\text{out}= \Delta E_\text{system}$$

where

- $E_\text{in}$ is the energy into the flywheel.
- $E_\text{out}$ is the energy out of the flywheel.
- $\Delta E_\text{system}$ is the change in energy of the flywheel.

An assumption is made that during braking there is no change in the potential energy, enthalpy of the flywheel, pressure or volume of the flywheel, so only kinetic energy will be considered. As the car is braking, no energy is dispersed by the flywheel, and the only energy into the flywheel is the initial kinetic energy of the car. The equation can be simplified to:

$$\frac{mv^2} {2} = \Delta E_\text{fly}$$

where

- $m$ is the mass of the car.
- $v$ is the initial velocity of the car just before braking.

The flywheel collects a percentage of the initial kinetic energy of the car, and this percentage can be represented by $\eta_\text{fly}$. The flywheel stores the energy as rotational kinetic energy. Because the energy is kept as kinetic energy and not transformed into another type of energy this process is efficient. The flywheel can only store so much energy, however, and this is limited by its maximum amount of rotational kinetic energy. This is determined based upon the inertia of the flywheel and its angular velocity. As the car sits idle, little rotational kinetic energy is lost over time so the initial amount of energy in the flywheel can be assumed to equal the final amount of energy distributed by the flywheel. The amount of kinetic energy distributed by the flywheel is therefore:

$$KE_\text{fly}=\frac{\eta_\text{fly} mv^2} {2}$$

=== Regenerative brakes ===
The brake regeneration energy 𝐸re can be calculated by : https://www.tandfonline.com/doi/abs/10.1080/00423114.2019.1567927 𝐸re=∫ ( 𝐹bm * ⁡𝑣 / 𝜂 ) d𝑡 where 𝐹bm is braking force, 𝑣 is the vehicle speed, and 𝜂 is the energy transfer efficiency in the braking energy recovery system (BERS). which may be affected by battery state of charge (SOC) and ambient temperature. In general, about 0.9.

Regenerative braking has a similar energy equation to the equation for the mechanical flywheel. Regenerative braking is a two-step process involving the motor/generator and the battery. The initial kinetic energy is transformed into electrical energy by the generator and is then converted into chemical energy by the battery. This process is less efficient than the flywheel. The efficiency of the generator can be represented by:

$$\eta_\text{gen}=\frac{W_\text{out}}{W_\text{in}}$$

where

- $W_\text{in}$ is the work into the generator.
- $W_\text{out}$ is the work produced by the generator.

The only work into the generator is the initial kinetic energy of the car and the only work produced by the generator is the electrical energy. Rearranging this equation to solve for the power produced by the generator gives this equation:

$$P_\text{gen}= \frac{\eta_\text{gen} mv^2}{2 \, \Delta t}$$

where

- $\Delta t$ is the amount of time the car brakes.
- $m$ is the mass of the car.
- $v$ is the initial velocity of the car just before braking.

The efficiency of the battery can be described as:

$$\eta_\text{batt}=\frac{P_\text{out}} {P_\text{in}}$$

where

- $P_\text{in}=P_\text{gen}$
- $P_\text{out}=\frac{W_\text{out}}{\Delta t}$

The work out of the battery represents the amount of energy produced by the regenerative brakes. This can be represented by:

$$W_\text{out}=\frac{\eta_\text{batt} \eta_\text{gen} mv^2}{2}$$

=== In cars ===
Energy efficiency of cars in towns and on motorways according to the DoE

Energy efficiency of electric cars in towns and on motorways according to the United States Department of Energy

A diagram by the United States Department of Energy (DoE) shows cars with internal combustion engines as having efficiency of typically 13% in urban driving, 20% in highway conditions. Braking in proportion to the useful mechanic energy amounts to 6/13 i.e. 46% in towns, and 2/20 i.e. 10% on motorways.

The DoE states that electric cars convert over 77% of the electrical energy from the grid to power at the wheels. The efficiency of an electric vehicle, taking into account losses due to the electric network, heating, and air conditioning is about 50% according to Jean-Marc Jancovici (however for the overall conversion see Embodied energy#Embodied energy in the energy field).

Consider the electric motor efficiency $\eta_\text{eng}=0.5$ and the braking proportion in towns $p=0.46$ and on motorways $p=0.1$.

Let us introduce $\eta_\text{recup}$ which is the recuperated proportion of braking energy. Let us assume $\eta_\text{recup}=0.6$.

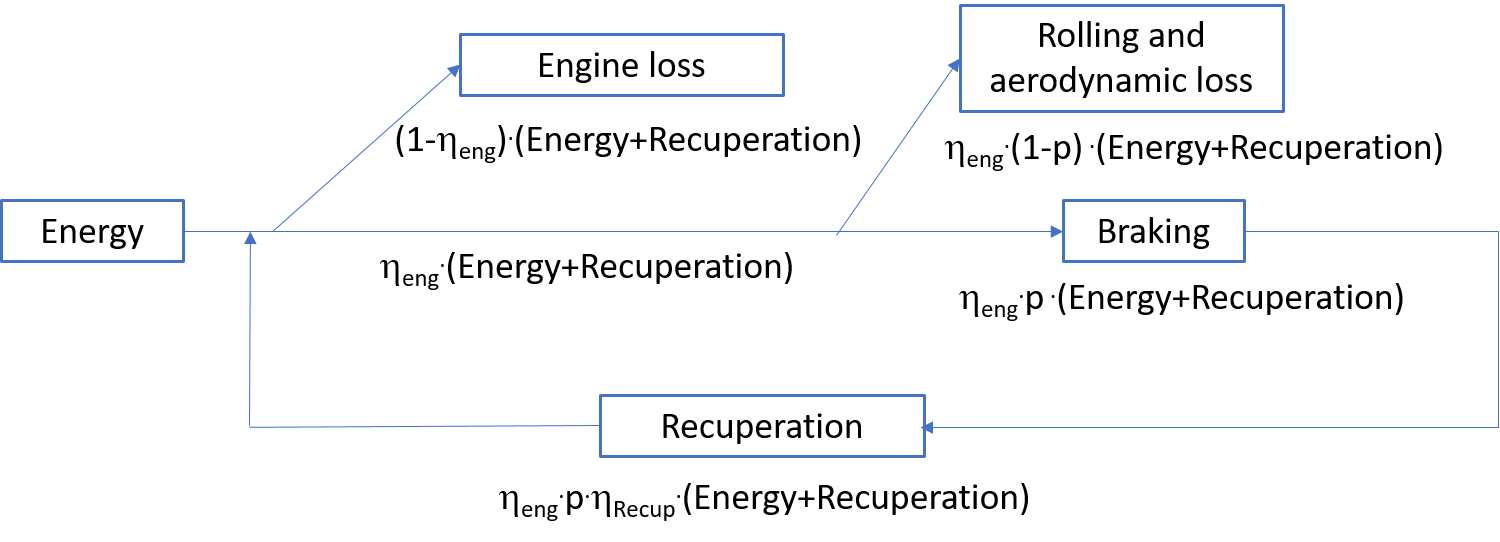
Description of the energy flux in the case of regenerative braking

Under these circumstances, $E$ being the energy flux arriving at the electric engine, $E_\text{braking}$ the energy flux lost while braking and $E_\text{recup}$ the recuperated energy flux, an equilibrium is reached according to the equations

$E_\text{braking}=(E + E_\text{recup}) \cdot \eta_\text{eng} \cdot p$ and $E_\text{recup}=\eta_\text{recup} \cdot E_\text{braking}$

thus $E_\text{braking}=\frac {E \cdot \eta_\text{eng} \cdot p} {1-\eta_\text{eng} \cdot p \cdot \eta_\text{recup}}$

It is as though the old energy flux $E$ was replaced by a new one $E \cdot (1-\eta_\text{eng} \cdot p \cdot \eta_\text{recup})$

The expected gain amounts to $\eta_\text{eng} \cdot p \cdot \eta_\text{recup}$

The higher the recuperation efficiency, the higher the recuperation.

The higher the efficiency between the electric motor and the wheels, the higher the recuperation.

The higher the braking proportion, the higher the recuperation.

On motorways, this figure would be 3%, and in cities it would amount to 14%.

== See also ==
- Kinetic energy recovery system – Automotive brake energy system
- Brake (railway) – Component of railway rolling stock
- Electromagnetic brake – Device to slow or stop vehicles
- Regenerative (design) – Process-oriented whole systems approach to design
- Regenerative shock absorber – Shock absorber that recovers energy during suspension movement
- Hybrid Synergy Drive – Hybrid car drivetrain made by Toyota
- Ram air turbine – Small power source installed on aircraft
- Dynamic braking – Use of the traction motors as generators when slowing a vehicle
- Electric motor – Machine that converts electrical energy into mechanical energy
- Self-winding watch – Timekeeping device that is driven by a spring that winds by motion of the wearer
- Brake run – Section of track to slow down roller coaster trains
- Electromagnetic clutch – Clutch that operates electrically but transmits torque mechanically
- Eddy current brake – Device used to slow or stop a moving object by generating eddy currents
