= Kinetic Traction Systems =

- Founded: 2010
- Headquarters: Chatsworth, California, United States
- Products: flywheel energy storage
- Website: http://www.kinetictraction.com/

Kinetic Traction Systems is a business founded in November 2010, producing Flywheel energy storage systems for electric railways and grid storage.

== Technology ==
Kinetic Traction Systems' main product uses flywheel energy storage technology developed by Pentadyne Power Corp; staff from Pentadyne joined Kinetic. The 36000 RPM flywheels are originally based on uranium centrifuge technology developed by Urenco

KTS' rail-side device uses a brushless DC motor/generator to spin up the flywheel to store electrical energy (for instance, from regenerative braking on trains) as kinetic energy; later to be converted back to electrical energy on demand.

== Uses ==
This system allows significant energy-efficiency improvements in urban rail systems; it has been used by NYC Transit and the London Underground.

Their grid storage system helps stabilise the microgrid on the island of Eigg

== Capacity ==
Usable stored energy is approximately 6 megajoules (1.7 kWh). The devices can provide bursts of 200 kilowatt-hours (720 MJ).
