= Magnetic particle clutch =

Mechanical device

A magnetic particle clutch is a special type of electromagnetic clutch which does not use friction plates. Instead, it uses a fine powder of magnetically susceptible material (typically stainless steel) to mechanically link an otherwise free-wheeling disc attached to one shaft, to a rotor attached to the other shaft.

This clutch is a form of a powder clutch. Torque is transmitted mechanically, through a metal powder filling. In the magnetically controlled version, an applied magnetic field is used to lock the particles in place. Unlike a pure magnetic coupling, however, this field takes no part in transmitting torque magnetically.

When a magnetic field is applied by a coil to the powder, it forms chains connecting the disc and rotor. The strength of the chains depends on the strength of the magnetic field. If there is not a magnetic field being applied to the powder, then powder is free floating. In this state the clutch is able to spin freely without any engagement of the input shaft to the output shaft. Magnetic particle clutches have made equipment control easier while also prolonging life of machine components.

== Components ==
- Electrical coil – produces the magnetic field for the particles to react to.
- Input shaft – the end of the main shaft that is attached to the driving force.
- Output shaft – the shaft that is on the other side of the clutch. This shaft is the one affected by the amount the clutch is being engaged.
- Bearings – allow the input and output shaft to spin freely without binding.
- Magnetic particles – the powdered magnetic material inside the clutch.

== Applications ==
In the late 1970s and early '80s, these were used in high-speed line printers to stop a spinning drum stamped with 96 or more columns, and 40 or more rows containing the alphabet. The drum was stopped momentarily by the clutch while hammers struck ink and paper in the appropriate column. Each revolution of the drum produced a full line of text and symbols. These drums spun at 300 to 1200 RPM.

Factories have also used them to regulate the speed in which a spool of material is unwound. A real-world example of this can be found in paper mills. Paper mills require material to be fed into their rollers at a constant rate. These clutches allow the material to be fed into the rollers at the right speed while also maintaining tension on the material. Magnetic particle clutches are also used in cycle controls. They allow cycles to have a constant amount of torque while the cycle is being completed. A great example of this is a machine that puts caps on bottles.

Magnetic particle clutches can also be found in gym equipment. They are used in treadmills to control the speed of the belt smoothly. It is also used to protect the electric motor of the machine from being overloaded when people with different weights use it.

== Advantages ==
Advantages over a friction plate clutch include:

- It does not exhibit the stick-slip phenomenon.
- The torque may be easily and quickly controlled.
- It is more resistant to wear.
- It may be used for continuous-slip applications.
- It has a very fast response time
- It provides overload protection.
- It works great for soft start applications.

== Disadvantages ==
- It can be more expensive than a conventional clutch system.
- It requires a power source to control the magnetic field.
