= Electromagnetic brake =

Device to slow or stop vehicles

Electromagnetic brakes or EM brakes are used to slow or stop vehicles using electromagnetic force to apply magnetic resistance through induction or mechanical resistance (friction). They were originally called electro-mechanical brakes but over the years the name changed to "electromagnetic brakes", referring to their actuation method which is generally unrelated to modern electro-mechanical brakes. Since becoming popular in the mid-20th century, especially in trains and trams, the variety of applications and brake designs has increased dramatically, but the basic operation remains the same.

Both electromagnetic brakes and eddy current brakes use electromagnetic force, but electromagnetic brakes ultimately depend on friction whereas eddy current brakes use magnetic force directly.

== Applications ==
In locomotives, a mechanical linkage transmits torque to an electromagnetic braking component.

Trams and trains use electromagnetic track brakes where the braking element is pressed by magnetic force to the rail. They are distinguished from mechanical track brakes, where the braking element is mechanically pressed on the rail.

Electric motors in industrial and robotic applications also employ electromagnetic brakes.

Recent design innovations have led to the application of electromagnetic brakes to aircraft applications. In this application, a combination motor/generator is used first as a motor to spin the tires up to speed prior to touchdown, thus reducing wear on the tires, and then as a generator to provide regenerative braking.

== Types ==
=== Single face brake ===
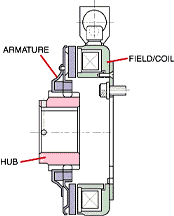
A-3 Electromagnetic brake

A friction-plate brake uses a single plate friction surface to engage the input and output members of the clutch. Single face electromagnetic brakes make up approximately 80% of all of the power applied brake applications.

=== Power off brake ===
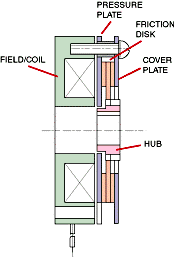
Electromagnetic Power Off Brake Spring Set

Power off brakes stop or hold a load when electrical power is either accidentally lost or intentionally disconnected. In the past, some companies have referred to these as "fail safe" brakes. These brakes are typically used on or near an electric motor. Typical applications include robotics, holding brakes for Z axis ball screws and servo motor brakes. Brakes are available in multiple voltages and can have either standard backlash or zero backlash hubs. Multiple disks can also be used to increase brake torque, without increasing brake diameter. There are 2 main types of holding brakes. The first is spring applied brakes. The second is permanent magnet brakes.

Spring type - When no electricity is applied to the brake, a spring pushes against a pressure plate, squeezing the friction disk between the inner pressure plate and the outer cover plate. This frictional clamping force is transferred to the hub, which is mounted to a shaft.

Permanent magnet type – A permanent magnet holding brake looks very similar to a standard power applied electromagnetic brake. Instead of squeezing a friction disk, via springs, it uses permanent magnets to attract a single face armature. When the brake is engaged, the permanent magnets create magnetic lines of flux, which can in turn attract the armature to the brake housing. To disengage the brake, power is applied to the coil which sets up an alternate magnetic field that cancels out the magnetic flux of the permanent magnets.

Both power off brakes are considered to be engaged when no power is applied to them. They are typically required to hold or to stop alone in the event of a loss of power or when power is not available in a machine circuit. Permanent magnet brakes have a very high torque for their size, but also require a constant current control to offset the permanent magnetic field. Spring applied brakes do not require a constant current control, they can use a simple rectifier, but are larger in diameter or would need stacked friction disks to increase the torque.

=== Particle brake ===
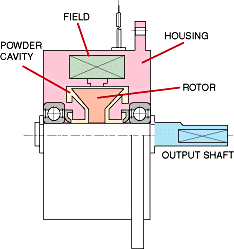
Magnetic Particle Brake

Magnetic particle brakes are unique in their design from other electro-mechanical brakes because of the wide operating torque range available. Like an electro-mechanical brake, torque to voltage is almost linear; however, in a magnetic particle brake, torque can be controlled very accurately (within the operating RPM range of the unit). This makes these units ideally suited for tension control applications, such as wire winding, foil, film, and tape tension control. Because of their fast response, they can also be used in high cycle applications, such as magnetic card readers, sorting machines and labeling equipment.

Magnetic particles (very similar to iron filings) are located in the powder cavity. When electricity is applied to the coil, the resulting magnetic flux tries to bind the particles together, almost like a magnetic particle slush. As the electric current is increased, the binding of the particles becomes stronger. The brake rotor passes through these bound particles. The output of the housing is rigidly attached to some portion of the machine. As the particles start to bind together, a resistant force is created on the rotor, slowing, and eventually stopping the output shaft.

=== Hysteresis power brake ===
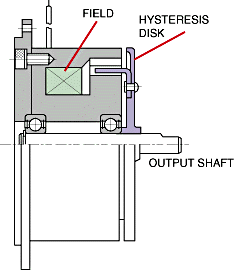
Electromagnetic Hysteresis Power Brake

Electrical hysteresis units have an extremely wide torque range. Since these units can be controlled remotely, they are ideal for test stand applications where varying torque is required. Since drag torque is minimal, these units offer the widest available torque range of any of the hysteresis products. Most applications involving powered hysteresis units are in test stand requirements.

When electricity is applied to the field, it creates an internal magnetic flux. That flux is then transferred into a hysteresis disk (that may be made from an AlNiCo alloy) passing through the field. The hysteresis disk is attached to the brake shaft. A magnetic drag on the hysteresis disk allows for a constant drag, or eventual stoppage of the output shaft.

When electricity is removed from the brake, the hysteresis disk is free to turn, and no relative force is transmitted between either member. Therefore, the only torque seen between the input and the output is bearing drag.

=== Multiple disk brake ===
Electromagnetic Multiple Disk Brake

Multiple disk brakes are used to deliver extremely high torque within a small space. These brakes can be used either wet or dry, which makes them ideal to run in multi-speed gear box applications, machine tool applications, or in off-road equipment.

Electro-mechanical disk brakes operate via electrical actuation, but transmit torque mechanically. When electricity is applied to the coil of an electromagnet, the magnetic flux attracts the armature to the face of the brake. As it does so, it squeezes the inner and outer friction disks together. The hub is normally mounted on the shaft that is rotating. The brake housing is mounted solidly to the machine frame. As the disks are squeezed, torque is transmitted from the hub into the machine frame, stopping and holding the shaft.

When electricity is removed from the brake, the armature is free to turn with the shaft. Springs keep the friction disk and armature away from each other. There is no contact between braking surfaces and minimal drag.

== See also ==
- Brake run
- Electromagnetic clutch
- Regenerative brake
- Eddy current brake
- Dynamic braking
