= Electromagnetic clutch =

Clutch that operates electrically but transmits torque mechanically

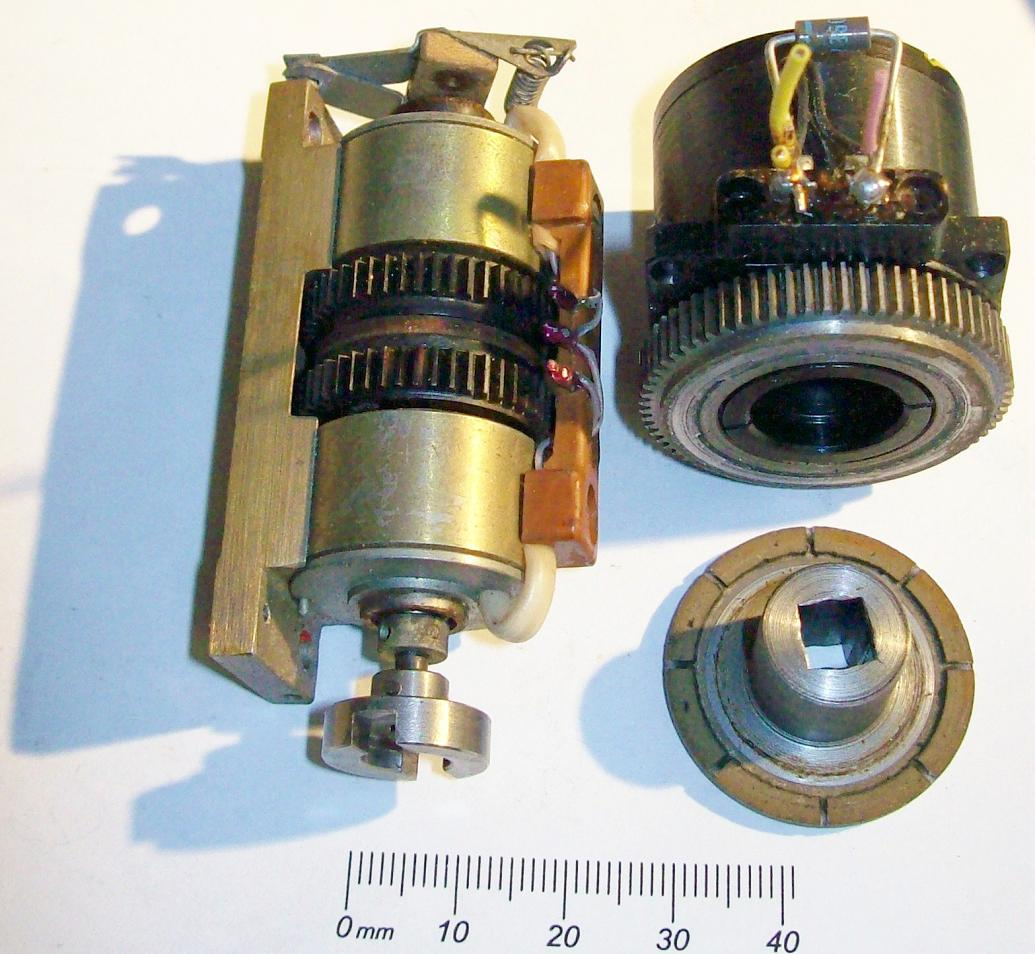
Magnetkuppl

Electromagnetic clutches are a type of clutch that operate electrically but transmit torque mechanically. This is why they used to be referred to as electro-mechanical clutches. Over the years, EM became known as electromagnetic versus electro-mechanical, referring more about their actuation method versus physical operation. Since the clutches started becoming popular over 60 years ago, the variety of applications and clutch designs has increased dramatically, but the basic operation remains the same today.

Single-face clutches make up approximately 90% of all electromagnetic clutch sales.

Electromagnetic clutches are most suitable for remote operation since no mechanical linkages are required to control their engagement, providing fast, smooth operation. However, because the activation energy dissipates as heat in the electromagnetic actuator when the clutch is engaged, there is a risk of overheating. Consequently, the maximum operating temperature of the clutch is limited by the temperature rating of the insulation of the electromagnet. This is a major limitation. Another disadvantage is higher initial cost.

== Friction-plate clutch ==
A friction-plate clutch uses a single plate friction surface to engage the input and output members of the clutch.

=== How it works ===
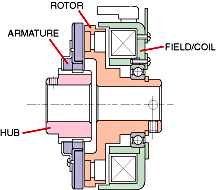

==== Engagement ====
When the clutch is actuated, current flows through the electromagnet producing a magnetic field. The rotor portion of the clutch becomes magnetized and sets up a magnetic loop that attracts the armature. The armature is pulled against the rotor and a frictional force is generated at contact. Within a relatively short time, the load is accelerated to match the speed of the rotor, thereby engaging the armature and the output hub of the clutch. In most instances, the rotor is constantly rotating with the input all the time.

==== Disengagement ====
When current is removed from the clutch, the armature is free to turn with the shaft. In most designs, springs hold the armature away from the rotor surface when power is released, creating a small air gap.

==== Cycling ====
Cycling is achieved by interrupting the current through the electromagnet. Slippage normally occurs only during acceleration. When the clutch is fully engaged, there is no relative slip, assuming the clutch is sized properly, and thus torque transfer is 100% efficient.

== Applications ==
=== Machinery ===
This type of clutch is used in some lawnmowers, copy machines, and conveyor drives. Other applications include packaging machinery, printing machinery, food processing machinery, and factory automation.

=== Vehicles ===
When the electromagnetic clutch is used in automobiles, there may be a clutch release switch inside the gear lever. The driver operates the switch by holding the gear lever to change the gear, thus cutting off current to the electromagnet and disengaging the clutch. With this mechanism, there is no need to depress the clutch pedal. Alternatively, the switch may be replaced by a touch sensor or proximity sensor which senses the presence of the hand near the lever and cuts off the current. The advantages of using this type of clutch for automobiles are that complicated linkages are not required to actuate the clutch, and the driver needs to apply a considerably reduced force to operate the clutch. It is a type of semi-automatic transmission.

Electromagnetic clutches are also often found in AWD systems, and are used to vary the amount of power sent to individual wheels or axles.

Most, but not all, automobile air conditioning systems are switched on and off by using an electromagnetic clutch. To activate the compressor the clutch is activated. This connects the air conditioning compressor's shaft end to a pulley driven by the engine's crankshaft through a belt.

Electromagnetic clutches have been used on diesel locomotives, e.g. by Hohenzollern Locomotive Works.

== Other types of electromagnetic clutches ==
=== Multiple disk clutches ===
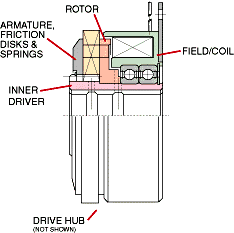
Multiple disk clutch

Introduction – Multiple disk clutches are used to deliver extremely high torque in a relatively small space. These clutches can be used dry or wet (oil bath). Running the clutches in an oil bath also greatly increases the heat dissipation capability, which makes them ideally suited for multiple speed gear boxes and machine tool applications.

How it works – Multiple disk clutches operate via an electrical actuation but transmit torque mechanically. When current is applied through the clutch coil, the coil becomes an electromagnet and produces magnetic lines of flux. These lines of flux are transferred through the small air gap between the field and the rotor. The rotor portion of the clutch becomes magnetized and sets up a magnetic loop, which attracts both the armature and friction disks. The attraction of the armature compresses (squeezes) the friction disks, transferring the torque from the in inner driver to the out disks. The output disks are connected to a gear, coupling, or pulley via drive cup. The clutch slips until the input and output RPMs are matched. This happens relatively quickly typically (0.2 - 2 sec).

When the current is removed from the clutch, the armature is free to turn with the shaft. Springs hold the friction disks away from each other, so there is no contact when the clutch is not engaged, creating a minimal amount of drag.

=== Electromagnetic tooth clutches ===
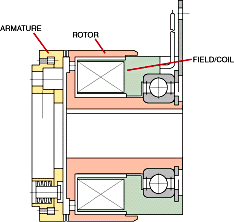
Electromagnetic tooth clutch

Introduction – Of all the electromagnetic clutches, the tooth clutches provide the greatest amount of torque in the smallest overall size. Because torque is transmitted without any slippage, clutches are ideal for multi stage machines where timing is critical such as multi-stage printing presses. Sometimes, exact timing needs to be kept, so tooth clutches can be made with a single position option which means that they will only engage at a specific degree mark. They can be used in dry or wet (oil bath) applications, so they are very well suited for gear box type drives.

They should not be used in high speed applications or applications that have engagement speeds over 50 rpm otherwise damage to the clutch teeth would occur when trying to engage the clutch.

How it works – Electromagnetic tooth clutches operate via an electric actuation but transmit torque mechanically. When current flows through the clutch coil, the coil becomes an electromagnet and produces magnetic lines of flux. This flux is then transferred through the small gap between the field and the rotor. The rotor portion of the clutch becomes magnetized and sets up a magnetic loop, which attracts the armature teeth to the rotor teeth. In most instances, the rotor is consistently rotating with the input (driver). As soon as the clutch armature and rotor are engaged, lock up is 100%.

When current is removed from the clutch field, the armature is free to turn with the shaft. Springs hold the armature away from the rotor surface when power is released, creating a small air gap and providing complete disengagement from input to output.

=== Electromagnetic particle clutches ===
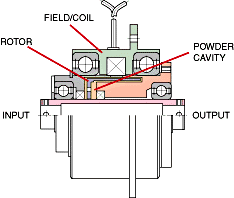
Electromagnetic particle clutch

Introduction – Magnetic particle clutches are unique in their design, from other electro-mechanical clutches because of the wide operating torque range available. Like a standard, single face clutch, torque to voltage is almost linear. However, in a magnetic particle clutch torque can be controlled very accurately. This makes these units ideally suited for tension control applications, such as wire winding, foil, film, and tape tension control. Because of their fast response, they can also be used in high cycle application, such as card readers, sorting machines, and labeling equipment.

How it works – Magnetic particles (very similar to iron filings) are located in the powder cavity. When current flows through the coil, the magnetic flux that is created tries to bind the particles together, almost like a magnetic particle slush. As the current is increased, the magnetic field builds, strengthening the binding of the particles. The clutch rotor passes through the bound particles, causing drag between the input and the output during rotation. Depending upon the output torque requirement, the output and input may lock at 100% transfer.

When current is removed from the clutch, the input is almost free to turn with the shaft. Because the magnetic particles remain in the cavity, all magnetic particle clutches have some minimum drag.

=== Hysteresis-powered clutch ===
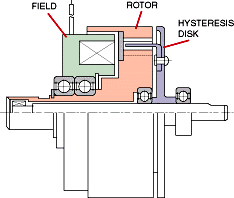
Hysteresis powered clutch

Electrical hysteresis units have an extremely high torque range. Since these units can be controlled remotely, they are ideal for testing applications where varying torque is required. Since drag torque is minimal, these units offer the widest available torque range of any electromagnetic product. Most applications involving powered hysteresis units are in test stand requirements. Since all torque is transmitted magnetically, there is no contact, so no wear occurs to any of the torque transfer components providing for extremely long life.

When the current is applied, it creates magnetic flux. This passes into the rotor portion of the field. The hysteresis disk physically passes through the rotor, without touching it. These disks have the ability to become magnetized depending upon the strength of the flux (this dissipates as flux is removed). This means, as the rotor rotates, magnetic drag between the rotor and the hysteresis disk takes place causing rotation. In a sense, the hysteresis disk is pulled after the rotor. Depending upon the output torque required, this pull eventually can match the input speed, giving a 100% lockup.

When current is removed from the clutch, the armature is free to turn and no relative force is transmitted between either member. Therefore, the only torque seen between the input and the output is bearing drag.

== See also ==
- Electromagnetic brake
- Magnetic coupling
