= List of museums in Washington, D.C. =

This list of museums in Washington, D.C. encompasses museums defined for this context as institutions (including nonprofit organizations, government entities, and private businesses) that collect and care for objects of cultural, artistic, scientific, or historical interest and make their collections or related exhibits available for public viewing. Also included are university and non-profit art galleries. Museums that exist only in cyberspace (i.e., virtual museums) are not included. The present list numbers 82 museums.

== Museums ==
Name	Image	Sponsoring Institution	Type	Summary
African American Civil War Memorial Museum		National Mall and Memorial Parks	African American history	History of the African American soldiers and sailors who fought for the Union in the United States Civil War
American University Museum		American University	Art	Regional, national, and international contemporary art
Anacostia Community Museum		Smithsonian Institution	African American history	Local history and culture
Anderson House		Society of the Cincinnati	Historic house	Early 1900s palatial residence with period furnishings, Society artifacts, portraits, armaments, and personal artifacts of Revolutionary War soldiers
Art Museum of the Americas		Organization of American States	Art	Museum for modern and contemporary Latin American and Caribbean art
Arts and Industries Building		Smithsonian Institution	History/Science	A national space to explore ideas and questions about the future
Belmont–Paul Women's Equality National Monument		National Park Service	Historic house – History	U.S. women's suffrage and equal-rights movements
Carter G. Woodson Home		National Park Service	Historic house	
Charles Sumner School		Charles Sumner School Museum and Archives	History	One of the first public school buildings erected for the education of Washington's black community
Chinese American Museum DC		Independent	American History	History, culture, arts, accomplishments, and contributions of Chinese Americans
Clara Barton Missing Soldiers Office Museum		Independent	History	Restored building that served as Clara Barton's Civil War apartment and later the Missing Soldiers Office (run by Barton)
DACOR Bacon House		DACOR	Historic house	Early 19th century historic residence. It has been adapted from a historic home into a private club and office space by Diplomatic and Consular Officers, Retired (DACOR) and the DACOR–Bacon House Foundation.
DAR Museum		Daughters of the American Revolution	Art	Features 30 period rooms of decorative arts including furniture, silver, paintings, ceramics, textiles, toys, quilts
Decatur House		White House Historical Association	Historic house	Early 19th-century house with exhibits about the White House
Dumbarton House		The National Society of The Colonial Dames of America	Historic house	Early 19th century period house and headquarters
Dumbarton Oaks Research Library and Collection		Dumbarton Oaks	Library	Exhibits of Byzantine and Pre-Columbian art and European masterpieces from its collections
Folger Shakespeare Library		Independent	Library	Exhibits from its collections about William Shakespeare
Ford's Theatre National Historic Site		National Park Service	History	Site of assassination of President Abraham Lincoln, includes theater presentation, Lincoln museum, and Petersen House where he was taken
Frederick Douglass National Historic Site		National Park Service	Historic house	Home and estate of Frederick Douglass, one of the most prominent African Americans of the 19th century
General Federation of Women's Clubs Headquarters		General Federation of Women's Clubs	Historic house	Tours of the social clubhouse headquarters, changing exhibits of art, photographs and artifacts from its collections
George Washington University Art Galleries		George Washington University	Art	Two galleries, includes painting, sculpture, and photographs, ranging from rare historic pieces to Washingtoniana and Americana to modern art
Georgetown University Art Galleries		Georgetown University	Art	Located in the Walsh building and around the Georgetown campus
German-American Heritage Museum of the USA		German-American Heritage Foundation of the USA	Ethnic German American	German-American history and culture, housed in a Victorian townhouse
Go-Go Museum		Independent	Music	Dedicated to Go-Go music, a variety of funk music developed in Washington D.C.
Heurich House Museum		Independent	Historic house	Gilded Age mansion with early household innovations
Hillwood Estate, Museum & Gardens		Independent	Decorative arts	Estate and gardens of Marjorie Merriweather Post, rooms decorated with her collections of 18th- and 19th-century French art, china and art treasures from Imperial Russia
Hirshhorn Museum and Sculpture Garden		Smithsonian Institution	Art	Contemporary and modern art
Historical Society of Washington, D.C.		Independent	History, Library	Exhibits of the city's history from its collections
House of the Temple		Ancient and Accepted Scottish Rite of Freemasonry	Masonic	Masonic principles of personal, social and intellectual freedom, artifacts of American history, Masonic regalia and memorabilia
Howard University Gallery of Art		Howard University	Art	Located in Childers Hall, home of the Fine Arts Division of the College of Arts and Sciences
Interior Museum		United States Department of the Interior	History	Activities of the agencies of the United States Department of the Interior, including the National Park Service, Bureau of Indian Affairs, Bureau of Land Management, Bureau of Reclamation, United States Fish and Wildlife Service and United States Geological Survey
International Spy Museum		Independent	History	Espionage history, artifacts, famous figures
Italian American Museum		Casa Italiana Sociocultural Center	History	Collection of art, artifacts, and oral histories depicting the lives of Italian-American immigrants
Kreeger Museum		Independent	Art	19th- and 20th-century paintings and sculptures by internationally known artists, works by local Washington artists, traditional west and central African art
L. Ron Hubbard House		Church of Scientology	Historic house	Residence of Scientology founder L. Ron Hubbard from 1955 until 1959
Library of Congress		Library of Congress	Library	Exhibits from its collections in American history, culture and art
Lillian & Albert Small Capital Jewish Museum		Independent	Ethnic – Jewish history	History of the local Jewish community; preserves the oldest synagogue building in the Washington, D.C., area; operated by the Jewish Historical Society of Greater Washington
Lincoln Memorial		National Park Service	History	Includes displays about the building of the Memorial and some of Lincoln's phrases
Mary McLeod Bethune Council House National Historic Site		National Park Service	Historic house	Home of educator and civil rights leader Mary McLeod Bethune
Meridian House		Meridian International Center	Art	Exhibitions of paintings, photographs, sculptures, videos, and crafts that reflect various aspects of American culture to encourage foreign understanding
Museum of the Bible		National Christian Foundation	Religious	Documents the narrative, history and impact of the Bible
Museum of the Palestinian People			History	Exhibits Palestinian artifacts, artwork, and history
National Air and Space Museum		Smithsonian Institution	Aerospace	History and science of aviation and spaceflight, as well as planetary science and terrestrial geology and geophysics
National Archives		National Archives and Records Administration	Archives / History	Exhibits from its collections including the Declaration of Independence, the Constitution, the Bill of Rights, and a copy of the 1297 Magna Carta confirmed by Edward I
National Bonsai and Penjing Museum		National Bonsai Foundation	Natural history	Located on the campus of the United States National Arboretum, Bonsai and Penjing botanical specimens and displays
National Building Museum		Independent	Architecture	Exhibits about architecture, design, engineering, construction, and urban planning
National Children's Museum		Independent	Children's	Serves children up to age 12 and their families through interactive exhibits exploring science, technology, engineering, art, and math.
National Deaf Life Museum		Gallaudet University	Culture/history	Permanent and rotating exhibits chronicling deaf culture and history
National Gallery of Art		Independent	Art	Paintings, drawings, prints, photographs, sculpture, medals, and decorative arts that trace the development of Western Art from the Middle Ages to the present
National Geographic Museum		National Geographic Society	Natural history	Operated by the National Geographic Society, changing exhibits of photography, natural history, culture and history
National Guard Memorial Museum		National Guard (United States)	Military	History of the National Guard of the United States from the Revolutionary War era to post-9/11 era
National Law Enforcement Museum		National Law Enforcement Officers Memorial Fund	History/ Forensic Science	Dedicated to telling the story of American law enforcement by providing visitors a "walk in the shoes" experience. The interactive exhibits and insightful programs are intended to expand and enrich the relationship shared by law enforcement and the community.
National Museum of African American History and Culture		Smithsonian Institution	Ethnic – African American	National museum devoted to the documentation of African American life, history, and culture.
National Museum of African Art		Smithsonian Institution	Art	African art and culture, includes paintings, musical instruments, sculpture, jewelry, regalia, textiles, pottery
National Museum of American History		Smithsonian Institution	History	American social, political, cultural, scientific and military history
National Museum of the American Indian		Smithsonian Institution	Ethnic – Native American	Life, languages, literature, history and arts of the Native Americans of the Western Hemisphere
National Museum of American Jewish Military History		Jewish War Veterans of the United States of America	Ethnic – Jewish – Military – History	Jewish Americans who served in the armed forces
National Museum of Asian Art		Smithsonian Institution	Art	Featuring 45,000 works of Asian art. Consists of two adjoining buildings, the Freer Gallery of Art and the Arthur M. Sackler Gallery.
National Museum of Natural History		Smithsonian Institution	Natural history	Galleries include paleontology, geology, mammals, human origins, insects, ocean life, gems and minerals, Western, African and Korean cultures
National Museum of the United States Navy		United States Navy	Maritime – Military	History of the U.S. Navy from the American Revolution to the present, naval artifacts, models, documents and fine art
National Museum of Women in the Arts		Independent	Art	Women's achievements in the visual, performing and literary arts
National Portrait Gallery		Smithsonian Institution	Art – History	Images and history of famous individual Americans
National Postal Museum		Smithsonian Institution	Philately	History of the United States Postal Service and of mail service around the world
The Octagon House		American Institute of Architects	Historic house	Early 19th-century townhouse
Old Korean Legation Museum		Overseas Korean Cultural Heritage Foundation	Historic house	Late 19th-century townhouse that served as the Korean legation from 1889 to 1905.
Old Stone House		National Park Service	Historic house	Mid 18th century period house, the oldest unchanged building in Washington, D.C.
O Street Museum Foundation		Independent	Art	The collection rotates and changes daily and includes art, music, architecture, memorabilia, manuscripts, sculpture and other items that promote exploration of the creative process.
The Phillips Collection		Independent	Art	American and European impressionist and modern art
The People's House: A White House Experience		White House Historical Association	History	Interactive museum about the history of the White House
Planet Word		Independent	Language Arts	Language and words
President Lincoln's Cottage at the Soldiers' Home		Independent	Historic house	Cottage retreat of President Abraham Lincoln and other Presidents
Renwick Gallery		Smithsonian Institution	Decorative arts	American craft and decorative arts from the 19th century to the 21st century
Rubell Museum DC		Independent	Contemporary art	Washington, D.C. satellite of the Miami-based Rubell Museum
Saint John Paul II National Shrine		Knights of Columbus	Religion	Life and papacy of Pope John Paul II and the history of Catholic heritage in North America
Salve Regina Gallery		Catholic University of America	Art	Part of Catholic University of America
S. Dillon Ripley Center		Smithsonian Institution	Exhibition	Exhibits of art, photography
Smithsonian American Art Museum		Smithsonian Institution	Art	American art that covers all regions and art movements found in the United States
Textile Museum		George Washington University	Textiles	Textiles from around the world including rugs, clothing, located at George Washington University
Tudor Place		Independent	Historic house	Mansion with European and American decorative arts including American silver, porcelain, furniture, glassware, sculpture, portraits, prints, and textiles
United States Capitol Visitor Center		United States Capitol	History	History of the U.S. Capitol and Congress
United States Holocaust Memorial Museum		Independent	History	History of the Holocaust in Europe
United States Navy Memorial Visitor Center		US Navy Memorial	Maritime – Military	Honor, Recognize, and celebrate the men and women of the Sea Services
White House		White House Historical Association	Historic house	Official state residence of the president of the United States, tours by advance reservation
The Wilderness Society Gallery		The Wilderness Society (United States)	Photography	Exhibits from its collections, including photos by Ansel Adams
Woman's National Democratic Club Museum		Woman's National Democratic Club	Historic house	Political memorabilia, artwork, and photographs in the Whittemore House
Woodrow Wilson House		Independent	Historic house	Home of President Woodrow Wilson after he left office

== Closed museums ==
- Army Medical Museum and Library, opened 1862, became the National Museum of Health and Medicine in 1989 and relocated to Silver Spring, Maryland in 2011
- Bead Museum, closed December 2008
- Black Fashion Museum, founded 1979, moved to Washington in 1994, closed in 2007 and collection donated to the National Museum of African American History and Culture
- Corcoran Gallery of Art, open 1869–2014. Art holdings donated to the National Gallery of Art, building donated to George Washington University
- Fondo del Sol
- Madame Tussauds Washington D.C., 2007–2021, featured wax sculptures of famous figures from politics, culture, sports, music and television, including the 45 U.S. presidents from George Washington to Donald Trump
- Marine Corps Museum, 1960–2005, collections now part of the National Museum of the Marine Corps
- National Gallery of Caricature and Cartoon Art, open 1994–1997, collections now at the Library of Congress
- National Jewish Museum, collections now online, trying to establish to new museum
- National Museum of Crime & Punishment, closed in September 2015 and is now operated as Alcatraz East in Pigeon Forge, Tennessee
- National Pinball Museum
- Newseum, founded 1997 in Rosslyn, Virginia, moved to Washington in 2008, closed December 2019 and is currently seeking new location
- Washington Doll's House and Toy Museum, founded in 1975, closed 2004
- Washington Gallery of Modern Art
- Wax Museums previous to Madame Tussaud's existed from 1958 to 1965 at 26th & E Streets, N.W. (current site of the John F. Kennedy Center]], from 1965 to 1974 at 5th & K Streets N.W. (former site of Old Center Market), and from 1974 to 1982 at 4th & E Streets S.W.
- USS Barry (DD-933), opened as a museum ship in 1984, closed in 2015

== See also ==
- Arboreta in Washington, D.C. (category)
- Aquaria in Washington, D.C. (category)
- Botanical gardens in Washington, D.C. (category)
- Houses in Washington, D.C. (category)
- Museums list
- Nature centers in Washington, D.C.
- Observatories in Washington, D.C. (category)
- Smithsonian museums
- Architecture of Washington, D.C.
