= Association for Diplomatic Studies and Training =

United States non-profit organization

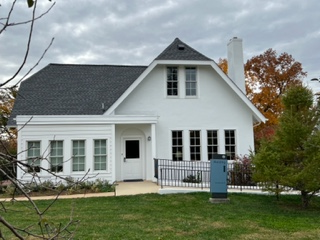
- ADST headquarters at the National Foreign Affairs Training Center, known as the cottage.
- Abbreviation: ADST
- Formation: 1986
- Founder: Stephen Low, Herbert Hansell, and Richard B. Parker
- Location: Arlington, Virginia, United States
- Coordinates: 38.867647°N 77.101536°W
- Products: World's largest collection of U.S. diplomatic oral history, two book series, and “Moments in U.S. Diplomatic History” short articles series
- Fields: International Relations (IR), American History, World History, Intelligence Studies, Diplomatic Studies
- President: Susan Rockwell Johnson
- Executive-Director: Dan Tikvart
- Website: adst.org

The Association for Diplomatic Studies and Training (ADST) is a United States 501(c)(3) non-profit organization established in 1986 by retired Foreign Service officers, headquartered at the George P. Shultz National Foreign Affairs Training Center in Arlington, Virginia. It produces and shares oral histories by American diplomats and facilitates the publication of books about diplomacy by diplomats and others. Its Foreign Affairs Oral History program has recorded over 2,600 oral histories and continues to grow; its book series includes over 100 books. ADST is located on the campus of the Foreign Service Institute in Arlington, Virginia. ADST is the sole American private organization principally committed to the collection of documents about recent U.S. diplomatic history.

== Mission ==
ADST's stated mission is to promote the importance of U.S. diplomacy by

capturing, preserving, and sharing the experiences of America's diplomats and other foreign affairs professionals to enrich diplomatic practitioners' professional knowledge and strengthen public appreciation of diplomacy's contribution to the national interest. ADST programs include:

- Recording the oral histories of diplomats, family members, and others;
- Facilitating the preparation and publication of books on diplomacy;
- Contributing to diplomatic case studies and educational materials;
- Supporting professional education at the Foreign Service Institute.

== History ==
Retired U.S. Foreign Service officer Charles "Stu" Kennedy started the oral history project after listening to several eulogies given at ambassador Charles Burke Elbrick's 1983 funeral, as he became concerned that the historically valuable personal recollections of U.S. diplomats might be lost forever if not recorded. Along with Victor Wolf Jr., who also worked on the early stages of the project, Kennedy recognized the need for outside help to produce the oral histories, along with volunteers and interviewers. In February 1985, the pair began the project with $10,000 at George Washington University. After Victor Wolf's death in 1986, Kennedy interviewed the nephew of Douglas MacArthur, Douglas MacArthur II.

In 1986, Stephen Low and Richard Parker founded the ADS (Association for Diplomatic Studies) to aid education at the Foreign Service Institute. This was separate from Kennedy's efforts, though Kennedy soon met with Richard Parker. In 1988, ADS contracted Kennedy to complete 18 oral histories. Parker then aided Kennedy in moving the project within the auspices of Georgetown University's Lauinger Library. In 1993, the oral history project joined ADST at FSI's new campus at Arlington Hall.

== Programs ==
=== Oral histories ===
ADST's major initiative is the Foreign Affairs Oral History Project. ADST interviews American diplomats after departure from government service about their career experiences and professional insights and assessments of leaders, successful and unsuccessful policies, and foreign conflicts. The oral history collection is referenced by scholars, authors, and media, including The Washington Post, The Atlantic, C-SPAN, RealClearPolitics, and others.

Since 1986, ADST's Foreign Affairs Oral History Program has recorded more than 2,600 interviews with U.S. foreign affairs practitioners. These include ambassadors, attachés, consuls, USIA and USAID officers, Foreign Service Nationals, spouses, and workers at the Departments of Agriculture, Treasury, and Commerce. Interviews are often conducted by former foreign service officers. The founder of the program, retired foreign service officer Charles Kennedy, has conducted the majority of the interviews.

Collectively, these oral histories span over 80 years and provide first-person accounts of many dramatic incidents in U.S. diplomacy, such as the Iran hostage crisis, the Beirut and Nairobi bombings, accounts from World War II, the Vietnam War, and more recent narratives from 9/11, Afghanistan, and Iraq. Annually about 60 new interviews are added, and most are between 50 and 200 pages. The collection totals over 500,000 pages. The collection also contains significant oral histories dealing with U.S. diplomacy provided by universities and presidential libraries. While most oral histories concern the time period after 1945, some detail experiences as early as 1917. Oral histories cover family background, early education, careers, and the retirement of subjects. At the end, interviewees are asked to share overall reflections on their life and career. The interviews are then transcribed, edited, formatted, and dates and names are fact checked. Examples of notable interviewees include Julia Child, Prudence Bushnell, John D. Negroponte, Harriet Elam-Thomas, Thomas Reeve Pickering, Shirley Temple Black, and A. Elizabeth Jones. In order to reflect the diversity of the Foreign Service, ADST has compiled a collection of oral histories of African American and Latino diplomats. In 2022, ADST collected a set of oral history on the twenty years of U.S. involvement in Afghanistan.

The oral history collection has become one of the largest in the country on any subject and the most significant archive on foreign affairs. Oral histories have been used as source material for several books, such as John Pomfret's The Beautiful Country and the Middle Kingdom: America and China, 1776 to the Present, Derek Leebaert's Grand Improvisation: America Confronts the British Superpower, 1945–1957, Timothy Weiner's Legacy of Ashes, and Margaret MacMillan's Nixon and Mao: The Week That Changed the World. The Oral History Collection is a part of the Library of Congress American Memory collection. It is unclassified, available to the public, and can be found at the Library's Frontline Diplomacy website. It is also available on ADST's site under Oral History Interviews. As result of the oral history program, in 2022, ADST received a Special Award for Service to the History Profession from the Society for History in the Federal Government.

=== Publications ===
In 1995 ADST's publication program began in 1995. ADST worked with DACOR in publishing the illustrated booklet, "A Brief History of United States Diplomacy." Afterwards, ADST collaborated with DACOR to create the Diplomats and Diplomacy Book Series. The first book published as a part of that series, Emperor Dead and Other Historic American Diplomatic Dispatches, exhibits foreign dispatches to the State Department between the years 1776 and 1965.

ADST has facilitated the publication of over 100 books pertaining to diplomacy, international history, and the Foreign Service. Books published in its Diplomats and Diplomacy Series include Nicholas Platt’s China Boys: How U.S. Relations with the PRC Began and Grew, Jane C. Loeffler's The Architecture of Diplomacy: Building America's Embassies, Herman J. Cohen's The Mind of the African Strongman: Conversations with Dictators, Statesmen, and Father Figures, Joyce E. Leader's From Hope to Horror: Diplomacy and the Making of the Rwanda Genocide, autobiographies of Brandon Grove, Robert H. Miller, and David Newson, and dozens of others. Among the life stories in ADST's Memoirs and Occasional Papers Series are those of Diego Asencio, John Gunther Dean, Ginny Carson Young, Deane R. Hinton, and Robert E. Gribbin.

=== Other ===
Other ADST resources include the video series "Tales of American Diplomacy", podcasts, and over 1,000 articles highlighting "Moments in U.S. Diplomatic History". Several resources have overlapping content in different formats to increase accessibility. ADST's podcasts include In Their Own Voices, the Cold War Series, Partners in Diplomacy, and Modern American Diplomacy. ADST's education landing page features six model high school lesson plans on diplomacy, based on oral history primary source material for educators. Examples include plans on the Cold War, WWII Female Codebreakers, Black Diplomats, and the Suez Canal. Country readers and subject readers comprising excerpts from oral histories compiled by country or topic facilitate research and enhance background knowledge.

ADST activities over the past three decades have also included organization of policy roundtables; a diplomatic history scholar in residence program; and a Cox Foundation awards program recognizing excellence in foreign language instruction. ADST has also created exhibits on the history of American diplomacy; these include A Brief History of American Diplomacy, displayed at NFATC, the National War College, and the State Department. In addition, ADST has worked on projects with USAID and USIP.

== See also ==
- Diplomatic and Consular Officers Retired (DACOR)
