= Rose Powhatan =

American artist from Washington, D.C. (born 194^)

- Born: 1946 (age 79–80)
- Education: Catholic University, Georgetown University, and Trinity University, University of London; Howard University (BFA, MA)
- Occupations: Mixed-media artist, author, storyteller and activist
- Known for: founding the Powhatan Intertribal Museum with her husband Albert Michael Auld (Jamaican Yamaye Taino descent).
- Spouse: Michael Auld
- Mother: Georgia Mills Jessup
- Awards: Cafritz Foundation fellow, Fulbright Scholar fellow

Rose Powhatan (born 1946) is an American mixed-media artist, author, storyteller, and activist. She is an inaugural member of the Culture Caucus at the John F. Kennedy Center for the Performing Arts. The Cultural Caucus was founded at the John F. Kennedy Center for the Performing Arts in Washington, DC. Rose Powhatan is currently a member of the Kennedy Center's Community Advisory Board. She is a Cafritz Foundation and Fulbright Scholar member.

Powhatan attended Howard University (BFA, cum laude, in Painting and Art History, MA in Art Education and Art History), Georgetown University, Catholic University, and the University of London.

== Background and family ==
Powhatan is from Washington, D.C. Her mother is artist Georgia Mills Jessup. Rose Powhatan married Michael Auld, and their son is Kiros Auld.

She has stated: "I am an Indigenous female elder descended from the Pamunkey and the Tauxenent (Dogue) tribes. Gary Gray, former chief of the Pamunkey Indian Tribe, states that their chief in the 1980s "handed out 'paper cards' to [Kiros] Auld's mother and grandmother" and: "We spent several years using exact criteria, and they didn't meet it. Kiros's family know they are not enrolled citizens of the tribe."

Her extended family includes 29 art practitioners.

== Education ==
Powhatan attended Howard University in Washington D.C., where she studied studio arts, art history, and education. She completed her graduate studies at the University of London.

== Museum ==
Powhatan and her husband, Michael Auld, cofounded the Powhatan Museum, in Washington, DC, 2000. Their website and collection provide information on the first European encounters in the Americas; the Powhatan Confederacy of the Virginia Territory and the Indigenous Peoples of the Caribbean, the Taino and Kalinago (Island Carib). The Powhatan Museum should not be confused with the Pamunkey Indian Museum and Cultural Center, a tribal museum in King William, Virginia.

== Artworks ==
Powhatan's artwork calls for respect for Indigenous cultures. She researches traditional Eastern Woodlands Indigenous designs for her artwork.

"Soweto/So-We-Too" is a silk-screen print that expresses the connection of Native and other oppressed people. Palestinians, Native Americans, and South Africans are represented by cultural symbols that are related to traditional housing. The colors in the print symbolize the four sacred Native American colors, directions, and races of humanity.

"Fire Woman Warrior" is a sculpture of Keziah Powhatan.

"Pocahontas Unmasked" is a print of a distant maternal cousin. This print is Powhatan's interpretation of an unmasked English version of Pocahontas. It is based on John White's watercolors based on the Amerindian phenotype from 1585.

== Exhibitions ==
=== Solo exhibitions ===
- Age-Old Tribe's Dream Painter, Fondo Del Sol, Washington D.C, December 19, 1990 – January 26, 1991.
- Culture Caucus Summer Festival: Rose Powhatan, The Reach at The Kennedy Center, Washington, D.C., September 2–3, 2022.
- Wingapo! Welcome to the Native American Dance Circle, The Kennedy Center, Washington D.C., July 8–10, 2021.

=== Group exhibitions ===
- Totems to Powhatan, Vienna, Virginia, metro station, 1988.
- "SUBMULOC": REVERSING THE TIDE, Fondo Del Sol, Washington, D.C., June 26, 1992 – July 11, 1992.
- The Land Carries Our Ancestors: Contemporary Art by Native Americans, National Gallery of Art, Washington, D.C., October 4, 2023 – January 15, 2024.
- Visual Power: 21st Century Native American Artists/Intellectuals, 2005, traveling exhibition, curated by Phoebe Farris

== Film ==
Powhatan appeared as an extra in the 2005 historical film The New World.

She also appeared in the 2008 HBO series John Adams. Powhatan acted in the role of Nancy Attucks, the Nattick Indian mother of Crispus Attucks, who was a hero of the American Revolutionary War.

Visitors to the Jamestown Settlement Park in Virginia can see Powhatan acting in the role of a 17th-century Pamunkey elder in the film “1607: A Nation Takes Root”.

Rose Powhatan is featured as a storyteller of Virginia Indian and other Indigenous American cultural origins on YouTube.

== Publications ==
=== Books ===
- The Things I Prefer to Be Forgotten (by Alexei Auld, illustrated by Powhatan) (2014)
- Tonto Canto Pocahontas (by Alexei Auld, illustrated by Powhatan) (2013)
- The People Who Stayed: Southeastern Indian Writing After Removal (edited by Geary Hobson, Janet McAdams and Kathryn Walkiewicz). (2010). Rose Powhatan contributed her memoir titled Surviving Document Genocide as the entree to the publication.

=== Articles ===
- "My American Liberty Story: Rose A. Powhatan"
- "Opinion | D.C. Once Had an Indigenous Queen, Cockacoeske, the Queen of Pamunkey. Remember Her Story".
