= Zandra Flemister =

American diplomat and U.S. Secret Service agent (1951–2023)

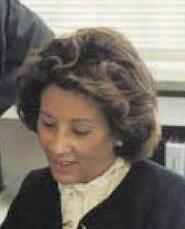
- Flemister in 2001
- Born: Zandra Iona Flemister; November 21, 1951; Frankfurt, Hesse, West Germany
- Died: February 21, 2023 (aged 71)
- Education: National Defense University; Northeastern University
- Employer(s): United States Foreign Service; United States Secret Service
- Known for: First African American woman to serve as a U.S. Secret Service agent

Zandra Iona Flemister (November 21, 1951 – February 21, 2023) was a Foreign Service Officer and United States Secret Service agent. Flemister received a bachelor's degree from Northeastern University and a master's degree from the National Defense University. She joined the Secret Service in 1974, becoming the first African American woman to serve as an agent. Four years later, she joined the United States Foreign Service, where she would serve for 33 years before retiring in 2011 because of early-onset Alzheimer's. Flemister, along with over 100 other African American secret service agents, brought a class action lawsuit against the Secret Service for racial discrimination.

== Early life ==
Zandra Flemister was born on November 21, 1951, at the 97th General Hospital in Frankfurt, Germany, located in the U.S. Zone of Occupation after World War II. Her parents, Joseph Benjamin Flemister, a Sergeant First Class in the U.S. Army, and Pearl Jenkins, a Foreign Service microfilm technician, had met and married in Alaska in 1948. Flemister spent her early childhood in Europe, moving from Germany to France, where she attended a French-speaking public school in Laon, a small city near the French-Belgian border. Her early exposure to different languages and cultures, instilled by her parents, would shape her worldview and career aspirations.

When Flemister was five years old, her parents separated, and she relocated with her mother to East Hartford, Connecticut, where they lived with her maternal grandparents, Samuel and Lela Jenkins. Her grandfather, a World War I veteran, was deeply involved in the Hartford African American community and was the founder of Camp Bennett, a summer camp aimed at serving urban African-American youth. Flemister spent her childhood engaged in various activities, including ballet and piano lessons, as her grandparents emphasized a well-rounded upbringing.

Flemister's education began at C.A. Barbour Elementary School in Hartford, where she had to adjust to the differences between the rigorous French educational system and the more relaxed American school system. As she progressed through Willowbrook Park Junior High School, Z Flemister excelled both socially and academically, which she described as a time when her "flowers were back in full bloom."

However, her high school years in South Glastonbury, a predominantly Euro-American suburb of Hartford, were marked by racial tensions. Flemister and her family were among the few African-American residents in the area, and she experienced both subtle and overt racism. Despite this, she became involved in school politics, joined the marching band, and participated in the international club.

Flemister also became engaged in civil rights activism, joining her mother in the historic 1963 March on Washington when she was 11 years old. By 16, she participated in the Poor People's Campaign and protested outside the 1968 Democratic National Convention in Chicago.

Following her high school graduation, Flemister enrolled at Northeastern University in Boston, where she majored in Political Science and participated in various work-study programs. Her time at Northeastern included various extracurricular activities, study abroad programs in the Soviet Union and Mexico, and work as a dormitory counselor.

== Career ==
=== Secret Service ===
“It was government service for which I had prepared,” Flemister said based on the influence of her parents, “and to government service, I was destined to go.” She set her sights on applying for a Secret Service job and was hired at the Secret Service in 1974 — not knowing that no one like her had ever served with the agency. Upon joining the Secret Service, Flemister protected the daughters of two U.S. presidents. According to John Collinge, her husband of 42 years and the father of her son Samuel, she took pride in “her skill at safeguarding” Gerald Ford’s teenage daughter Susan “during dates without being obtrusive.” She would attend school with Amy Carter and would sit discreetly in the back of her classroom while America's first daughter received her lessons.

==== Flemister's Experience in the Secret Service ====
U.S. Secret Service director Kimberly Cheatle released a statement regarding her death: “a trailblazer who dedicated her life to service and inspired a future generation of agents.” As the first African-American female secret service agent, she says she experienced discrimination as she trailblazed her way in the field, breaking glass ceilings for women and Black people after the Civil Rights Movement. According to The Washington Post, Flemister always felt the weight of being the first and labored to serve despite enduring actions of bigotry from her superiors and colleagues. During the early part of her career, she was assigned to the most unwanted roles in the agency. She was relegated to covering the details of the president, vice president and other dignitaries and their families to covering forgery, counterfeiting and other financial crimes. Once another agent in the Washington field office questioned out loud after pointing at her, “Whose prisoner is she?” She said she was “embarrassed and humiliated.” One time a co-worker taped a picture of a gorilla on her official ID card, covering her photograph, as a cruel joke. Even when she asked about elevating her assignments, hoping to be invited to one of the better-paying security details, she was told she had to cut her afro hairstyle.

Flemister not only experienced personal acts of racism, but endured systemic racism and cultural bigotry in her time with the agency. White agents at the time threw the N-word around loosely in her presence. Reports recall a time Flemister was working with presidents of Senegal and Grenada during one of their visits to the United States and heard White agents calling the two Black leaders the N-word. There were times when she would be allowed to serve the nation at important events. She'd written that those opportunities were “solely for exhibition” and at those times she felt like the “show African American female agent.” “I remained in the Secret Service because I wanted to be a trailblazer for other African-American women,” she said in a 2000 affidavit filed in support of a class-action lawsuit that claimed the agency has historically practiced racial discrimination. She wrote, “With my requests for transfers to career-enhancing squads consistently denied, my credibility and competency constantly questioned, and the common use of racial epithets in my presence. I saw the handwriting on the wall: Because of my race I would never be allowed to have a successful career in the Secret Service.”

==== The Lawsuit against the Secret Service ====
She participated with over 100 Black agents and former agents in the class-action lawsuit that sought to expose the culture of racial discrimination in the Secret Service. Despite filing a complaint against the agency, she is still remembered for her outstanding work and the impact her service made on the nation.

=== Foreign Service ===
After leaving the Secret Service in 1978, Flemister transferred to the Foreign Service, accepting a lower salary. She was one of 35 people in the 136th A-100 class. Her future husband, John Collinge, was also in this class. Flemister was a specialist in consular affairs and earned a master's degree in military logistics. Despite requesting to retire in 2011 because of early on-set Alzheimer's, Flemister had a long and successful career in the Foreign Service.

==== Buenos Aires, Argentina (1979-1980) ====
Flemister's assignment to Argentina was a difficult one; the embassy suffered from a frequent change in leadership, poor morale, and a high cost of living. Sometimes, Flemister “bartered cigarettes and scotch for maintenance services at her apartment.” Additionally, she faced racial discrimination. People sometimes mistook her for a maid while she was shopping.

“I am not at ease in public. How can I be, everyone stares at me, especially children. A girl from the embassy and I went out. She introduced me to one of her Argentine friends and without asking he put his hands in my hair to feel it. I was so surprised I didn't know how to react. So there you have it, what it is like to be Black in B.A.” -Zandra Flemister

Flemister formed a strong social circle with the other women working at the embassy. They would frequently shop together, watch movies, or go out for drinks. She was particularly close with Barbara Johnson who worked for the United States Information Service. Flemister also adopted a kitten, who she called Ivan the Terrible.

In the fall of 1979, Flemister, Johnson, and another friend were accosted by several people from the Air Force Intelligence in Argentina. Although at first believing they were just drunk, Flemister later wrote in a letter to Collinge that she believed this attack was orchestrated by the Argentine Government in retaliation for “Carter Administration criticism of Argentine human rights abuses.”

==== Madrid, Spain (1980-1982) ====
Flemister was the vice consul in the consular section while working in Spain. She considered Madrid a much better posting then Buenos Aires, with her husband stating “Zandra faced none of the racial harassment she experienced in Argentina.”

“Things are set up better. I have a better quality of bosses. The national employees not only know their jobs, they are self starters and need almost no supervision. I am happy to be working with the people I work with. It is a relief after BA.” -Zandra Flemister

In 1981, Flemister married John Collinge in Khartoum, Sudan. They got married in Sudan because the marriage laws required less of a delay. The specific law was the Marriage of Non Mohammedans Act of 1926.

Flemister and Collinge had a son, who they named Sam, on November 10, 1983. He was diagnosed with autism when he was two years old.

==== Islamabad, Pakistan (1986-1987) ====
Flemister's assignment to Pakistan was also her and Collinge's first assignment as a married couple. Most of her time was involved with stopping Pakistan farmers from growing opium-poppy flowers. She also faced sexism during her time in Islamabad, though wearing what other Pakistan women wore mitigated this slightly.

While in Islamabad, Flemister became good friends with Joyce Barr, who Collinge described as “a great Foreign Service Officer who as a Black woman had to fight her way up narrowly surviving being run out of the service as a junior officer”. Barr would later go on the be the US Ambassador to Namibia.

==== Washington DC, USA (1987-1991) ====
Flemister was on the FBI's Lockerbie Task Force from 1988 to 1989. She then worked in the CA Office of Citizen Services until 1991.

==== London, England (1991-1994) ====
Flemister was promoted to FS-02 while stationed in London. This assignment was good for her career, but hurt Collinge's career.

Flemister was highly placed in an anti-fraud unit, and often worked with the local police and British immigration. She was in charge of “tracking, documenting and reporting illegal immigration cases.” In addition, Flemister worked to improve the exchange of information between other embassies and local agencies.

While in London, Flemister received a Meritorious Honor Award.

==== Washington DC, USA (1994-1999) ====
This assignment was not good for Flemister's career, but was helpful for her husband's career and critical for their son's health.

==== Seoul, South Korea (1999-2002) ====
Flemister's assignment to Korea was crucial to her career and she was appointed the “deputy to Consul General Dick Herman and Acting Consul General in his absence.” She was also promoted to FS-01.

Flemister helped bring down a visa fraud ring in Seoul.

Upon leaving Korea, Flemister wrote: “My work here is done! The end of my 3 year Seoul odyssey. I have proved I can effectively run a huge section and supervise lots of people. Only 4 JO resignations, one flood, one POTUS visit, 3 SecState visits and EER MADNESS!....However, biggest boost was my promotion to 1...and landed good onward assignment....Korea will never be my favorite posting...but I will remember it fondly.”

==== Washington DC, USA (2002-2005) ====
From 2002 to 2003, Flemister studied at the formerly named Industrial College of the Armed Forces at the National Defense University. She earned a master's degree in military logistics.

From 2003 to 2005, she was at the PER/Performance Evaluation.

==== Islamabad, Pakistan (2005-2006) ====
Flemister actively sought out this assignment. She would either be promoted or forcibly retired in 2007 and she and Collinge agreed that the “logical career move was an unaccompanied danger post assignment” because it would make her more competitive.

Flemister described this assignment as “the most challenging and satisfying of my career...an opportunity I sought to test my managerial skills in handling the expected demands of a high security post in a time of difficult bilateral relations, as well as such unexpected challenges as responding to a major natural disaster.”

Pat, the Deputy Chief of Mission to the current ambassador at Islamabad, had these words to share: “She knew exactly what issues mattered most to the Government of Pakistan...to the American expat community, and to Washington and successfully managed them. Zandra left her section stronger than she found it.”

Flemister was promoted to Senior Foreign Service Officer in October 2006.

==== Washington DC, USA (2006-2011) ====
Flemister was a consular inspector in the Office of Inspector General from 2006 to 2008.

Flemister represented the State Department in liaison with the Federal Bureau of Investigation's Terrorist Screening Center from 2008 to 2010.

In 2009, she became to worry something was wrong with her memory. Flemister scheduled an appointment and was told that she was “suffering from progressive and irreversible memory loss” Flemister may have had Frontotemporal Dementia (FTD), according to her husband. Her dementia was affecting her professional work at this point.

Flemister was on the Board of Examiners (BEX) from 2010 to 2011. This assignment started off well, but quickly deteriorated. She eventually told the BEX director that she was medically unfit and retired on April 30, 2011.

== After Retirement ==
Following her retirement, Zandra's cognitive health deteriorated. Initially hoping to work part-time as a rehired annuitant under the WAE (When Actually Employed) program, Zandra soon realized that her memory decline prevented her from doing so. She also attempted to volunteer at Bethesda Naval Hospital and the Montgomery County Library, but her memory issues made it difficult for her to pursue these efforts.

As Zandra's memory loss progressed, she lost her ability to manage daily tasks, and her relationships with her loved ones were deeply affected. Her son, Sam, became estranged from her, as he struggled to understand that her cognitive decline caused her to forget him. In time, Zandra also lost the ability to recognize other friends and family members.

By 2014, Zandra's condition had deteriorated to the point that she could no longer navigate the Metro system or vote. After an episode in 2014 in which she became lost while driving, her car keys were taken away, further curtailing her independence. In 2015, Zandra's husband sought support from IONA Senior Services, which led to her participation in their Wellness and Arts Center. Zandra attended the center until she could no longer be left alone safely. In July 2015, Zandra entered long-term care at Arden Courts Kensington, a dementia care facility.

Zandra was formally diagnosed with early-onset Alzheimer's in 2014, a diagnosis that allowed her to access benefits from her long-term care policy. Despite the financial strain of her medical needs, the policy provided critical support, covering significant costs before it was exhausted. Zandra's condition continued to decline, and by 2022, she was in hospice care at Arden Courts. She died in 2023.
