= American Jewish Military Heritage Project =

The American Jewish Military Heritage Project is an internet educational project sponsored by the National Museum of American Jewish Military History, providing links to websites, films, and literature documenting the contributions of Jews to the American military or sites of interest to Jewish American veterans.

== Content ==
Content that can be accessed by links in the collection already include subjects such as "General Veterans Websites", "Veterans Bibliography", "Hall of Heroes: American Jewish Recipients of The Medal of Honor", "350 Year Commemoration of Jews in America's Military", "Celebrate 350 Jewish Life in America 1654-2004", "First Jewish Service from World War II Germany (Youtube.com Video)", "Jews in the American Military Bibliography", "Jews in Fiction", and "Best War Movies".

Videos in the collection include the films "The Price of Freedom: The Military Experience", "Special Forces in the Vietnam War", "World War II", "The Korean War", and "First Jewish Service from World War II Germany (YouTube.com video)".
