= Conservation and restoration at the Smithsonian Institution =

Conservation and restoration at the Smithsonian Institution deals with the care of the 138 million artifacts located in the collections of Smithsonian Institution. Work is conducted by one research center, the Museum Conservation Institute (MCI), and by conservators at the Smithsonian's museums, galleries, zoo. Smithsonian conservators provide myriad services to their units, including exhibit preparation of the museum collection and loan objects, advising on object care, training for future generations of conservationists, engaging in routine preventive care on a daily basis, conducting research projects related to the collections, and examining objects for evidence of manufacturing techniques and previous restorations All conservation labs collectively further the mission of the Smithsonian Institution, "the increase and diffusion of knowledge." Founded in 1846 the Smithsonian is the world's largest museum and research complex, consisting of 19 museums and galleries, the National Zoological Park, and nine research facilities.

== Museum Conservation Institute (MCI) ==
Museum Conservation Institute, the only research center focused on conservation, provides technical studies and scientific analyses for most of the Smithsonian's collections, and brings unique analytical capabilities to Smithsonian researchers, including a central mass spectroscopy instrument core and advanced technological capabilities. MCI is a center for specialized technical collection research and conservation for all Smithsonian units and collections, and these services are available at no charge.

=== Conservation Project/Publication ===
New Insights into the Cleaning of Paintings” conference held at the Universidad Politécnica de Valencia and Museum Conservation Institute

== National Museum of African Art (NMAfA) ==
The National Museum of African Art houses a state-of-the-art conservation laboratory, which includes a complete x-radiography system with digital imaging. The conservation department routinely collaborates with MCI and other SI units to analyze African art materials, investigate manufacturing processes, and resolve treatment problems. In turn, the department serves as a national and international authority on the conservation of African art.

=== Type of Objects ===
The Walt Disney-Tishman African Art Collection.

=== Conservation Project/Publication ===
Wax Coatings on Ethnographic Metal Objects: Justifications for Allowing a Tradition to Wane by Dana Moffett

== National Air and Space Museum (NASM) ==
At the National Air and Space Museum, the Emil Buehler Conservation Laboratory and the Mary Baker Engen Restoration Hangar is where conservators devise innovative treatment plans, offer guidance on storage and exhibition conditions, and determine the best possible ways to preserve the artifacts of the National Air and Space Museum which has two locations; one, on the National Mall, and the Steven F. Udvar-Hazy Center, in Chantilly Virginia for future generations.

=== Type of Objects ===
1903 Wright Flyer, Spirit of St. Louis, Spaceship One, Apollo 11 command module, Hubble Space Telescope test vehicle, pace Shuttle Discovery, B-29 Super-fortress Enola Gay, Concorde, Lockheed Martin SR-71 Blackbird, and Boeing Stratoliner.

=== Conservation Project/Publication ===
History, Care, and Handling of America's Spacesuits: Problems in Modern Materials by Mary T. Baker & Ed McManus

== Smithsonian American Art Museum (SAAM)/ National Portrait Gallery (NPG) ==
At the Smithsonian American Art Museum, the Lunder Conservation Center, serves as the conservation center for three Smithsonian units; the American Art Museum, the National Portrait Gallery, and the Renwick Gallery. Lunder is the first art conservation facility to allow the public permanent behind-the-scenes views of the preservation work of museums. The Center features floor-to-ceiling glass walls that allow the public to view all aspects of conservation work— work that is traditionally done behind the scenes at other museums and conservation centers. Interactive kiosks and special displays make it easy for visitors to learn about the importance of conservation and show how to take an active role in caring for public art and monuments, as well as how to care for personal treasures at home.

=== Type of Objects ===
Photography, modern folk and self-taught art, African American art, Latino art, New Deal art, impressionist paintings, complete collection of presidential portraits and American contemporary crafts and decorative arts from the 19th to the 21st centuries.

=== Conservation Project/Publication ===
Blow It Off: Moving Beyond Compressed Air With Carbon Dioxide Snow by L. H. (Hugh) Shockey Jr.

== National Museum of the American Indian (NMAI) ==
Conservation for National Museum of the American Indian's collection is conducted at the Cultural Resources Center (CRC), the second of three facilities comprising the Smithsonian's National Museum of the American Indian. The facility is state-of-the-art and includes separate laboratories for working on textiles and objects, a technical library, a photography studio, a scientific analytical lab, and mount-making spaces. In addition, the office actively engages in conservation training—on and off-site— and is committed to conducting research working in partnership with Native Americans on ethnographic and archaeological materials.

=== Type of Objects ===
Wall of gold objects, Geronimo's rifle.

=== Conservation Project/Publication ===
Woven by the Grandmothers: Twenty-Four Blankets Travel to the Navajo Nation by Susan Heald & Kathleen E. Ash-Milby

== Freer & Sackler Galleries of Art (Freer Sackler) ==
Conservation at the Freer & Sackler Galleries of Art is broken into four sections:Asian Paintings, Objects, Paper, and Exhibitions. Conservators are responsible for conducting technical examinations of objects already in the collection and those under consideration for acquisition. They also collaborate frequently with the department's scientists on technical and applied research. Training and professional outreach efforts are an integral part of the department's commitment to educating future conservators, museum professionals, and the public about conservation.

=== Type of Objects ===
South Asian sculpture, Chinese jades and bronzes, modern Japanese ceramics, Chinese paintings, Indian sculpture, Islamic painting and metal-ware, Japanese lacquer, Korean ceramics, Whistler's Peacock Room.

=== Conservation Project/Publication ===
The Treatment of Chinese Ancestor Portraits: An Introduction to Chinese Painting Conservation Techniques by Valerie Lee, Xiangmei Gu & Yuan-Li Hou

== Hirshhorn Museum and Sculpture Garden (Hirshhorn) ==
Within the conservation lab at the Hirshhorn Museum and Sculpture Garden, specialized activities for the treatment and care of paintings, sculpture, works on paper, and time-based media are performed. As an aid in treatment and to better understand the artist's creative methods and materials, conservators closely examine works of art using a variety of technical tools, including stereo-binocular microscopes and ultraviolet light. Conservators also use an array of analytical methods to identify under-drawings, pigments, binding media, and coating materials. All treatments involve collaboration with curators, and frequently scientists, to determine the condition of a work of art, guide treatment decisions, and examine the artist's working methods and procedures.

=== Type of objects ===
In-depth collection of modern masters and works by emerging artists; cutting-edge films; sculptures by Rodin, Matisse, and Moore.

=== Conservation Project/Publication ===
Formation of a Long-Term Preservation Plan for a Computer Program by Siebren Versteeg

== National Zoological Park (National Zoo) ==
The Smithsonian Conservation Biology Institute (SCBI) serves as an umbrella for the Smithsonian's global effort to conserve species and train future generations of conservationists. Ecological processes are highly complex... life and the world are dynamic and ever-changing—it is only with long-term records that many [biological] trends can be deciphered. The SCBI is the only unit of the Smithsonian Institution exclusively devoted to the study of wildlife conservation.

=== Type of Objects ===
Giant pandas, Asian elephants, white-naped cranes, western lowland gorillas, Sumatran tigers, cheetahs, and North Island brown kiwis.

=== Conservation Project/Publication ===
Global Tiger Initiative

== National Museum of Natural History (NMNH) ==
At the National Museum of Natural History, the Anthropology Conservation Laboratory (ACL) conducts conservation on the National Museum of Natural history's more than 126 million natural science specimens and cultural artifacts. The ACL provides professional care for collections; reviews prospective acquisitions and loans; prepares collections for exhibit and loan; maintains objects on exhibit in the National Museum of Natural History; reviews sampling requests; advises on object care; and implements preventive conservation projects.

=== Type of Objects ===
Hope diamond, dinosaur fossils, gems, and minerals.

=== Conservation Project/Publication ===
A History of Pest Control Measures in the Anthropology Collections, National Museum of Natural History, Smithsonian Institution by Lisa Goldberg

== National Postal Museum (NPM) ==
At the National Postal Museum, the Preservation Office is responsible for conservation of the Museum collection.

=== Type of Objects ===
World's largest stamp gallery, full-size Freight-liner semi-truck cab cutaway, vintage mail planes, stagecoach, 1931 Ford Model A postal truck, replica of a railway car; and videos.

=== Conservation Project/Publication ===
The Mailman’s Special
