= Charles Stuart Kennedy =

American historian (1928–2022)

- Born: Charles Stuart Kennedy; 1928; Chicago, Illinois
- Died: January 2, 2022 (aged 93)
- Education: Boston University MA Williams College BA
- Known for: Foreign Affairs Oral History Program
- Scientific career
- Fields: History, Foreign relations of the United States
- Workplaces: Association for Diplomatic Studies and Training

Charles Stuart "Stu" Kennedy, Jr (1928 – January 2, 2022) was an oral historian of American diplomats. He was the founder of the Foreign Affairs Oral History Program at the Association for Diplomatic Studies and Training. From 1985 onward he conducted over a thousand oral histories of retired American diplomats.

== Biography ==
Born in Chicago in 1928, Kennedy moved with his mother and two elder brothers to the Pasadena area of California in the early 1930s, where he attended a series of public elementary schools. Later his mother took him to Annapolis where a brother attended the Naval Academy. He went to Kent School in Connecticut, graduating in 1946 then on to Williams College where he obtained an honors degree in history. Upon graduating in 1950, Kennedy joined the United States Air Force as an enlisted man in the intelligence branch. After a year's study of Russian at the Army Language School in Monterey, California, he served in Korea during the Korean War and Germany. At the end of his four-year enlistment he studied at Boston University and received a MA in history. Having taken and passed the Foreign Service written examination in 1954 he took the oral examination after leaving the Air Force and passed that hurdle and entered the Foreign Service in 1955.

== Work ==
In his 30 years in the Foreign Service Kennedy was a consular officer dealing with the protection of American citizens abroad, the issuance of visas to foreigners and assistance to the growing number of Americans visiting overseas in Frankfurt, Germany, Saudi Arabia, Belgrade, Yugoslavia, then in the war zone of South Vietnam as consul general, then in Athens, Greece, Seoul, South Korea and finally Naples, Italy as consul general.

Kennedy retired from the Foreign Service in 1985 and wrote a history of the United States Consular Service which was published in 1990 by the Greenwood Press. A revised edition was published in 2015 and covered the years up to 1924. Realizing that the work of American diplomats was barely acknowledged, except for a few great names, such as Benjamin Franklin, in the teaching of American history, he started an oral history program, first at George Washington University in 1985 and then at Georgetown University. These efforts were barely funded and the oral history did not have much support until the creation of the Association for Diplomatic Studies and Training in 1986 by a group of retired Foreign Service officers. Since that time Stu Kennedy has been director of the Foreign Affairs Oral History Program of the Association. He has conducted some 1,000 oral histories of retired American diplomats whose careers range from the 1920s to the present. These are inclusive interviews running about 10 hours, especially those done in later periods, and cover early childhood, education, experiences outside the diplomatic period as well as service to the State Department. Both career and non-career officers are covered. The texts of the interviews are available on the Library of Congress's website.

Kennedy was awarded the Foreign Service Cup from the Director General of the Foreign Service in 1997 for his work as an oral historian and in 2014 received the Award for Lifetime Contribution to American Diplomacy from the American Foreign Service Association (AFSA). As of 2017 he is still conducting interviews.

In 2014 Kennedy was presented with the Lifetime Contributions to American Diplomacy Award by the American Foreign Service Association.

Kennedy died on January 2, 2022.

== Publications ==
- The American Consul : A History of the United States Consular Service, 1776-1914, 1990, ISBN 0313272123
