= Georgia Mills Jessup =

American painter (1926–2016)

- Born: March 19, 1926; Washington, D.C.
- Died: December 24, 2016 (aged 90)
- Citizenship: United States
- Education: Howard University, Catholic University of America
- Known for: painting
- Children: Rose Powhatan

Georgia Mills Jessup (March 19, 1926 – December 24, 2016) was an American painter, sculptor, ceramicist, muralist, and collage artist.

== Early life and education ==
Jessup, from of Washington, D.C., was of African-American, Native American, and European descent. Her father, Joseph Mills, identified as a Pamunkey descendant; her mother was Margaret Hall Mills, a hairdresser who had dreamed of a career in the theater.

Gary Gray, former chief of the Pamunkey Indian Tribe states that their chief in the 1980s "handed out 'paper cards' to [Kiros] Auld's mother and grandmother" and, "We spent several years using exact criteria, and they didn't meet it. Kiros's family know they are not enrolled citizens of the tribe.'"

The 13th of 18 children, she was one of 29 members of her family who followed an artistic profession. After an early display of artistic talent she was apprenticed to Herman L. Walker; two of her paintings were shown at the 1939 World's Fair, when she was just 13 years old. Jessup was a 1943 graduate of Dunbar High School. She received a Bachelor of Fine Arts degree from Howard University, where she studied with Loïs Mailou Jones, in 1959, following that with a Master of Fine Arts degree from the Catholic University of America in 1969.

== Career ==
Jessup spent thirteen years teaching art in the public schools of Washington, D.C., eventually becoming supervisor of art education for the system. She also taught at the prominent private school Sidwell Friends. She founded "The World is Your Museum", forerunner of the Capital Children's Museum, and was the first artist-in-residence at the Smithsonian Institution's Anacostia Community Museum.

In 1979, Jessup's work appeared alongside the work of her two daughters and one son-in-law in an exhibit called "Family Re-Union" at the Market 5 Gallery in Washington, D.C. A Washington Post journalist who covered the exhibit's opening described Jessup's paintings as showing "her maternal fear at her sons' bad experiences with managers and her frustration at the displacement of the poor." Jessup spoke to the journalist about the difficulty Black artists had in getting recognition for their work at the time: "I had shows at two Georgetown galleries in the 1960s, then have been represented in juried shows, but for the mainstream galleries it's been mainly tokenism in a few group shows."

By the time of her death, Jessup's work had been exhibited at places including the juried Irene Leache Memorial Biennial Art Show, the Castelli Gallery in New York City, the Smithsonian Museum of Natural History, Catholic University, and other museums and universities. The Maryland Women's Hall of Fame honored her in 2016 for her "outstanding contributions and leadership in the Arts."

Jessup's 1967 painting Rainy Night, Downtown is in the collection of the National Museum of Women in the Arts. The view in the painting was inspired by the view Jessup had from her car window as she sat at the intersection of H and 14th Streets NW in D.C. The painting is "a universal experience of the pulsating life of a large city at night," according to M. Therese Southgate. Other works are in the Anacostia Community Museum and in private collections.

She also received awards from organizations including the Research Club of Washington, D.C.; the Urban League; and the American Red Cross.

== Personal life ==
Jessup had two sons and two daughters, all of whom became involved in the arts. Daughter Rose Powhatan is a mixed-media artist who founded and directs the Powhatan Museum of Indigenous Arts and Culture. Her other daughter, Marsha Jessup, is a medical illustrator. Sons Juaquin Jessup (who played for two years with the funk band Mandrill) and Miklos Jessup are both musicians. Her nephew David Mills was a journalist and Emmy Award-winning television writer.

She died at home in Columbia, Maryland, on December 24, 2016, at the age of 90. She was survived by her four children, five grandchildren, and 11 great-grandchildren.
