= Foreign Service Institute =

United States government diplomatic training program

Coordinates: 38.8677°N 77.1023°W

- Seal of the U.S. Department of State

Agency overview
- Formed: March 13, 1947; 79 years ago
- Headquarters: National Foreign Affairs Training Center, Arlington County, Virginia, U.S.
- Employees: 1,332 (as of December 2012)
- Annual budget: $115 million (FY 2012)
- Agency executive: Howard A. Van Vranken, Director of FSI
- Parent department: U.S. Department of State
- Website: Official Website

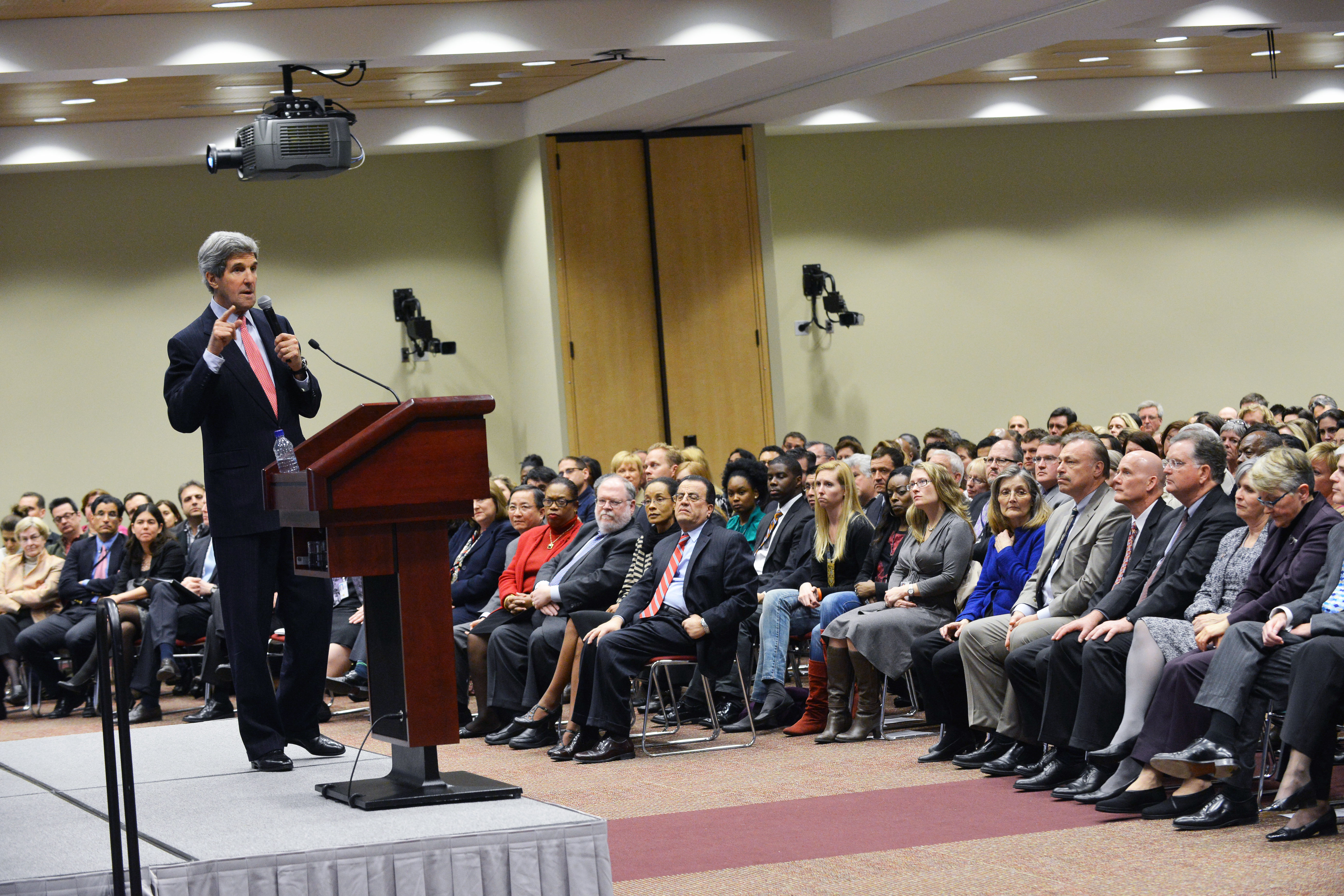
Secretary of State John Kerry speaks at the Foreign Service Institute in 2013.

The Foreign Service Institute (FSI) is the United States federal government's primary training institution for members of the United States Foreign Service community, preparing American diplomats as well as other professionals to advance United States foreign policy objectives overseas and in Washington. FSI provides more than 800 courses—including up to 70 foreign languages—to more than 225,000 enrollees a year from the United States Department of State and more than 50 other government agencies and the military service branches. FSI is based at the National Foreign Affairs Training Center in Arlington, Virginia.

The institute's programs include training for the development of all cadres of the U.S. Department of State, including United States Foreign Service, Civil Service, and Locally Employed staff, who serve at U.S. embassies and consulates overseas as well as in domestic offices. Ranging in length from one day to two years, courses are designed to equip foreign affairs professionals with the knowledge, skills, and attitudes needed to achieve U.S. foreign policy priorities, to promote successful performance in each professional assignment, to assist in navigating international transitions, and to enhance the leadership and management capabilities of the U.S. foreign affairs community. Other courses and resources help family members prepare for the demands of a mobile lifestyle and living abroad, and provide employees and their families with important information about such critical and timely topics as emergency preparedness and cyber-security awareness, among others.

The FSI director – the chief learning officer responsible for professional training for the State Department and federal foreign affairs agencies – is equivalent in rank to an assistant secretary of state and is appointed by the secretary of state.

== History ==
The Foreign Service Institute was first proposed as an in-service, graduate-level training institute for State Department employees and others in the Foreign Service. A number of different training schools and programs preceded the Foreign Service Institute, including the Consular School of Application (1907), the Wilson Diplomatic School (1909), the Foreign Service School (1924), the Foreign Service Officers' Training School (1931) and the Division of Training Services (1945).

In 1946, President Truman signed legislation that enabled Secretary of State George C. Marshall to establish the Institute on March 13, 1947. The Foreign Service Institute was initially authorized in Title VII of the Foreign Service Act. The issuance of Departmental orders fulfilling this section of the Act were delayed by the need to first resolve certain administrative issues. The orders were ultimately issued and, on March 13, 1947, Secretary of State George Marshall announced the establishment of the Foreign Service Institute.

In 1947, the Foreign Service Institute opened in the Mayfair Building in the Foggy Bottom neighborhood of Washington, D.C., at 2115 C Street NW, a building that was subsequently razed for the new State Department headquarters. The institute included four schools: Basic Officer Training, Advanced Officer Training, Management and Administrative Training, and Language Training. FSI then moved to leased space in Rosslyn, Virginia until October 1993, when it relocated to its current home. In 1954, the Wriston Report criticized the resources and support being devoted to FSI, and in the following year, FSI overhauled its curriculum, adding longer specialized training, putting a greater emphasis on language training, and opening up courses to wives of Foreign Service Officers.

In October 1993, FSI moved to the National Foreign Affairs Training Center in Arlington, Virginia, and remains headquartered there today.

In 2017, FSI celebrated the 70th anniversary of its founding, with the Association for Diplomatic Studies and Training releasing an e-book in honor of its anniversary.

== Organization ==
The Foreign Service Institute comprises the School of Language Studies, the School of Professional and Area Studies, the School of Applied Information Technology, the Leadership and Management School, the Transition Center, and the Office of the Historian. FSI also contains an executive office for administrative functions and a number of cross-cutting, Institute-wide offices.

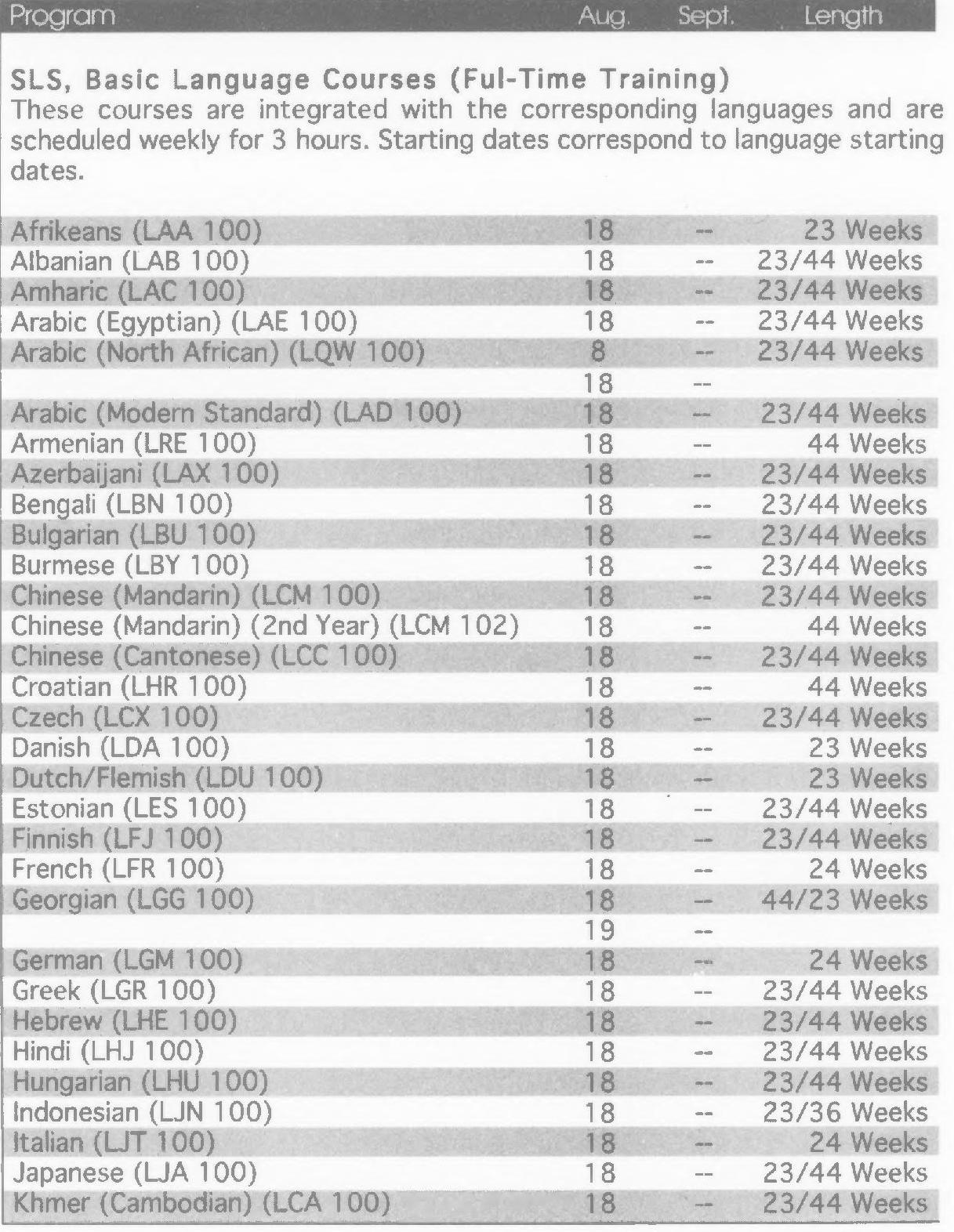
A selection of language courses advertised in State Magazine by the SLS in July 1997

The School of Language Studies (SLS) offers instruction in more than 70 languages and proficiency testing in over 100 languages. Enrollments may be 8–44 weeks, depending on the difficulty of the language and the individual's proficiency objectives. The Foreign Service Institute's School of Language Studies also maintains a network of language field schools in Taipei, Yokohama, Seoul, and other regional programs in the Middle East, North Africa, and Asia where a further 44 weeks of instruction is offered overseas in Mandarin Chinese, Japanese, Korean, and Arabic. Programs and courses of study also include self-study, early morning classes and distance learning courses. FSI is a co-creator of the speaking and reading language proficiency rating scales used throughout the U.S. government. SLS is active within the U.S. government's interagency community of language trainers and testers and frequently benchmarks with external foreign affairs agencies on language instruction.

The School of Professional and Area Studies (SPAS) offers training in foreign affairs specialties, such as consular, management tradecraft, political and economic affairs, public diplomacy, curriculum and staff development, office management, and orientation programs. It also offers guidance on the socio-cultural patterns, politics, economics, and international relations of world regions and individual countries. SPAS provides tailored programs in Consular, Economic and Commercial, Management, Office Management, Political, and Public Diplomacy, as well as new-hire orientation programs and in-depth Area Studies courses, such as Global China Area Studies and Iran Area Studies. SPAS is also home to the Center for the Study of the Conduct of Diplomacy (CSCD), which examines recent diplomatic experiences in order to capture best practices and lessons learned. CSCD produces comparative analyses which are incorporated into FSI training and used to help prepare foreign affairs professionals at all ranks for the challenges faced at U.S. missions around the world.

The School of Applied Information Technology (SAIT) is divided into four broad generalities: training to improve the business application skills of all employees, training in the technologies employed across the Department of State for IT professionals, IRM tradecraft courses that provide IT managers with broad IT management skills, and training for new Information Management Specialists and Information Management Technical Specialists to prepare them for initial and continued overseas employment with the department.

The Leadership and Management School (LMS) offers mandatory and elective leadership and management training for supervisors and managers from entry to executive levels; roundtables and policy seminars for senior leaders; and crisis management training overseas and at the National Foreign Affairs Training Center.

The Transition Center (TC) prepares employees and their family members for effectiveness in the foreign affairs community throughout, and after, their careers. The Transition Center provides: insights and information on all domestic and overseas posts; workshops and courses on Foreign Service life skills and security training; and training, counseling, and other assistance for Department of State and foreign affairs employees from other agencies leaving U.S. Government service. TC's Center of Excellence in Foreign Affairs Resilience (CEFAR) provides consultations and training designed to help individuals, family members, and teams perform in high-stress and high-level-threat environments.

The Office of the Historian (OH) is responsible, under law, for the preparation and publication of the official documentary history of U.S. foreign policy in the Foreign Relations of the United States series. Published since 1861, the series contains documents from numerous government agencies that reveal how U.S. foreign policy was created and executed at the highest levels. Additionally, the office prepares policy-supportive historical studies, helps train department personnel through historical components taught in Foreign Service Institute courses, and answers historical research questions from scholars, educators, students, journalists, and other agencies. The office's website includes a full text archive of the Foreign Relations series, as well as numerous publications and datasets on the department's institutional history and the history of U.S. foreign relations.

== See also ==
- Defense Language Institute – military counterpart for language instruction
- Language education
- List of language self-study programs
- National Technical Information Service – US Government sales source for FSI language material.
- A-100 class
- Senior Seminar in Foreign Policy
- Association for Diplomatic Studies and Training
