= Dupont-Kalorama Museums Consortium =

- Locations in Washington, D.C. Dupont-Kalorama Museums Consortium (the United States)
- Coordinates: 38.912833°N 77.041917°W
- Website: www.dkmuseums.com

The Dupont-Kalorama Museums Consortium was formed in 1983 to help promote the Washington, D.C. museums that are not located on the National Mall. Most of the museums are located in the historic Dupont Circle and Kalorama neighborhoods near Embassy Row and the group has grown from its original seven museums in the 1980s to its current total of nine. Among the group's notable events is the free Museum Walk Weekend, held annually on the first full weekend in June. For its work to promote its member museums, the consortium was named a Member of the week by Cultural Tourism DC.

== Members ==
The museums that comprise the consortium include the following:

- Anderson House
- Dumbarton House
- National Museum of American Jewish Military History
- The Phillips Collection
- Woodrow Wilson House
