= Diplomatic and Consular Officers, Retired =

American professional association for retired diplomats

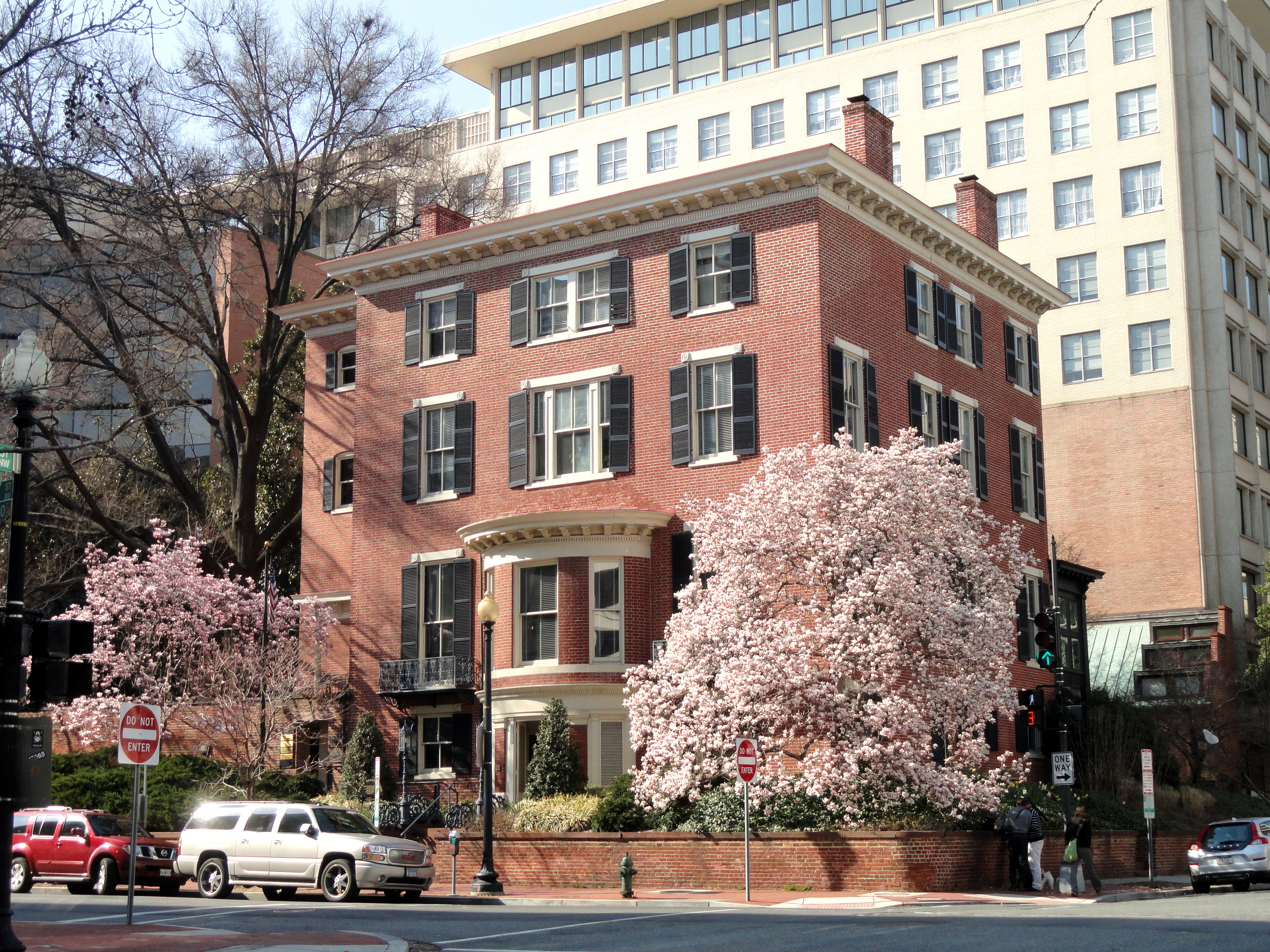
- The DACOR–Bacon House in Washington, D.C.
- Abbreviation: DACOR
- Formation: 1952
- Type: 501(c)(4) professional association
- Headquarters: DACOR–Bacon House, Washington, D.C.
- President: Thomas A. Shannon Jr.
- Website: dacorbacon.org

Diplomatic and Consular Officers, Retired (DACOR) is a 501(c)(4) professional membership association and the primary membership group for retired foreign affairs personnel, including former U.S. Foreign Service officers. DACOR was formed in 1952 as a professional and social network for the U.S. diplomatic community; the organization conducts educational programs, awards scholarships, and hosts discussions about U.S. diplomacy.

DACOR is headquartered in the Ringgold–Carroll House (commonly referred to as the DACOR–Bacon House) in Washington, D.C. DACOR collaborates closely with the DACOR–Bacon House Foundation (a 501(c)(3) nonprofit organization) that works to preserve the historic home and to promote education about the U.S. diplomatic profession.

DACOR presents the DACOR Foreign Service Cup annually since 1967 to honor retired ambassadors for their post-government contributions. In partnership with the Association for Diplomatic Studies and Training, DACOR co-publishes the ADST-DACOR Diplomats and Diplomacy Book Series. Since 1984, the organization has held annual memorial services at Rock Creek Cemetery for Foreign Service officers. In 2025, DACOR celebrated the bicentennial of the Ringgold–Carroll House.

== History ==
Following World War II, the U.S. Foreign Service experienced rapid growth, and there was a need for a formal method for retired diplomats to maintain their professional relationships with colleagues and to assist the State Department in achieving its mission objectives via the private sector. In addition to retaining social relationships, retired diplomats were concerned about the inadequate financial assistance they received through Foreign Service annuity payments and did not receive a universal health insurance plan. DACOR was officially incorporated in the District of Columbia as a corporation in 1952. The organization received federal tax-exempt status in June 1956.

In 1965, DACOR cooperated with the U.S. Department of State to establish Foreign Service Day. Every year on the same day, Foreign Service Day brings together current employees of the U.S. Department of State and individuals who are retired from the Department.

Virginia Murray Bacon, a Washington socialite and one of the first female members of DACOR, donated her home, the Ringgold–Carroll House, to the Bacon Foundation as a "living memorial" to her late husband, Congressman Robert L. Bacon, in 1980. In 1985, the DACOR Foundation merged with the Bacon Foundation to form the DACOR–Bacon House Foundation. This provided DACOR with a permanent location for the headquarters of the organization close to the U.S. Department of State in the Foggy Bottom neighborhood.

== DACOR–Bacon House ==
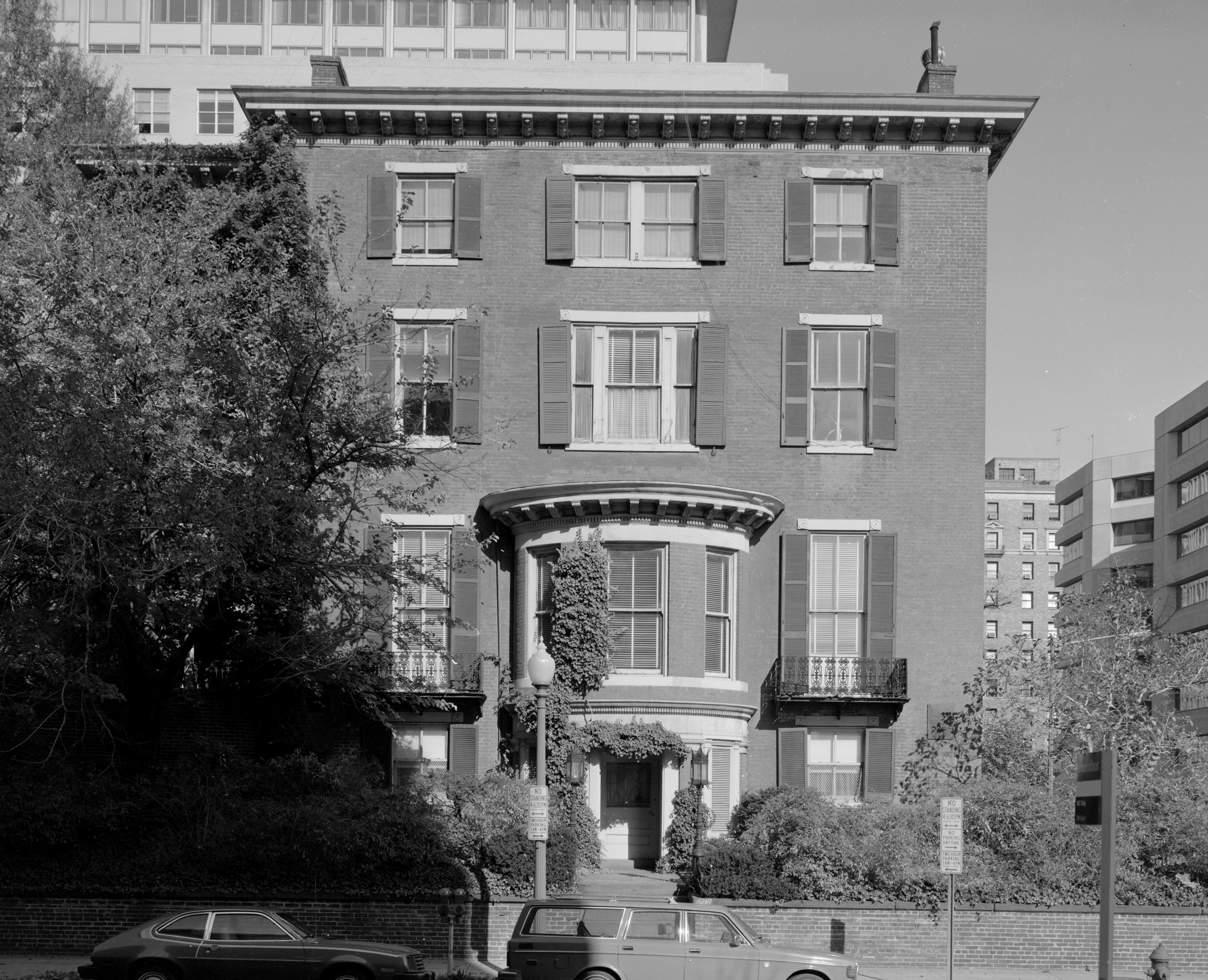
The DACOR–Bacon House, originally built in 1824–1825

The DACOR–Bacon House is a four-story Federal-style red brick townhouse, located at 1801 F Street NW, approximately two blocks south of the White House. Built between 1824 and 1825 for U.S. Marshal Tench Ringgold, using the labor of enslaved people, the Ringgold–Carroll House is one of only a few homes constructed prior to the 19th century that remain standing in the vicinity of the White House. The house was listed on the National Register of Historic Places on July 26, 1973.

The house has had several notable residents and tenants. During the winter of 1832–1833, Chief Justice John Marshall temporarily resided in the house, during his court sessions in the nation's capital. Between 1875 and 1878, the house was rented to the Russian Imperial Minister Nikolai Shishkin for official purposes. Today, the house operates as a museum showcasing items and artwork concerning diplomatic endeavors. In addition, the house serves as a social club for DACOR members. The house contains a dining room, meeting areas, and guest bedrooms.

=== Architecture ===
Many of the original architectural elements of the home are preserved inside the house. These elements consist of sandstone stairways, gas-lit chandeliers in the drawing rooms, and a sliding door connecting the north drawing room to the gallery. When owner Sallie Sprigg Carroll added a third complete story to the house in the 1870s, she also added floor-to-ceiling windows on the second floor. Additionally, she added decorative iron balconies and a two-story projecting bay. The walled garden in the back yard features a large willow oak tree. The tree was originally purchased by Virginia Murray Bacon in Silver Spring, Maryland, and then was moved to the garden using a crane and placed over the garden wall.

=== Preservation efforts ===
To preserve the exterior of the house, the DACOR–Bacon House Foundation has implemented measures to protect the house. Specifically, the foundation has secured a perpetual conservation easement to preserve the house for its historical significance. In 2021 and again in 2024, the DACOR–Bacon House Foundation commissioned a historic structure assessment report that examined the physical condition of the house and identified the necessary repairs to restore the house to its original condition.

== Organizational structure and operations ==
While the American Foreign Service Association (AFSA) advocates for the interests of active-duty Foreign Service officers, DACOR focuses primarily on advocating for the interests of retired Foreign Service officers. The organization provides both social networking opportunities and administrative activities to assist retired Foreign Service officers in promoting the interests of the Foreign Service. DACOR has approximately 2,600 members.

== Recognitions ==
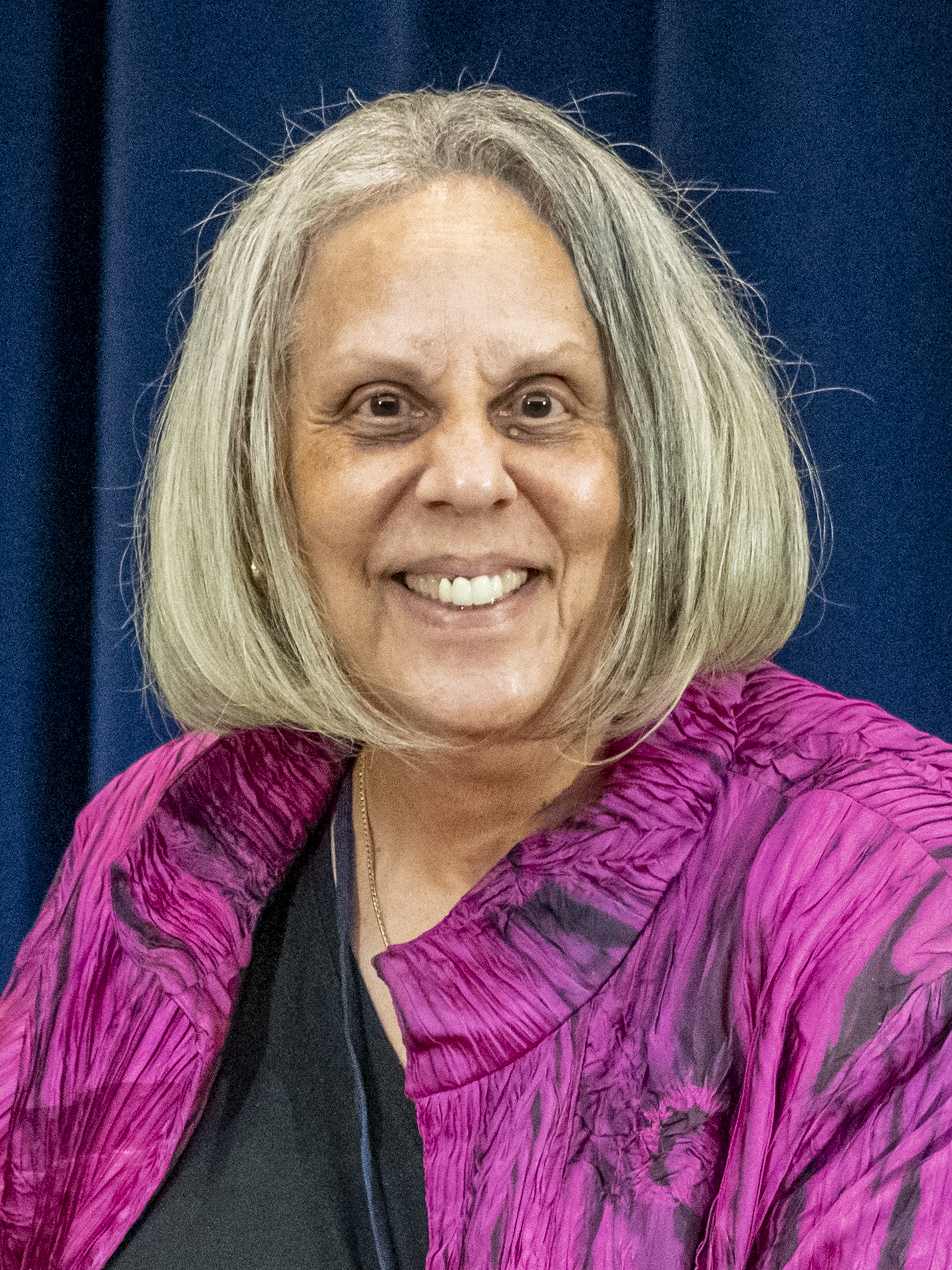
Aurelia E. Brazeal receives the DACOR Foreign Service Cup in 2023

DACOR recognizes the accomplishments of Foreign Service officers by awarding three separate recognitions:

- DACOR Foreign Service Cup: The DACOR Foreign Service Cup is the DACOR organization's highest recognition awarded to retired ambassadors and senior level officials since 1967 for their post-government service contributions to the Foreign Service. Recent recipients of the DACOR Foreign Service Cup include Ambassador Nicholas Burns (2025), Ambassador Aurelia E. Brazeal (2023), and Ambassador Thomas R. Pickering.
- DACOR President's Cup for Exceptional Service to DACOR: The DACOR President's Cup for Exceptional Service to DACOR is a recognition awarded to DACOR members who contribute significantly to the success of the organization and the DACOR–Bacon House Foundation.
- DACOR Eleanor Dodson Tragen Award: The DACOR Eleanor Dodson Tragen Award is an award recognizing the spouse, family member, or domestic partner of a Foreign Service officer who advocates for the interests of Foreign Service families.

== Publications ==
As part of its collaborative relationship with the Association for Diplomatic Studies and Training (ADST), DACOR, in conjunction with ADST, publishes the ADST-DACOR Diplomats and Diplomacy Book Series, established in 1996. To date, DACOR and ADST have jointly published more than 75 books regarding U.S. diplomatic history. DACOR and ADST also collaborate on the Foreign Affairs Oral History Collection, consisting of more than 2,600 interviews that are available online at the Library of Congress.

== Memorial services ==
Since 1984, DACOR has held an ecumenical Memorial Day service annually at Rock Creek Cemetery in Washington, D.C. to commemorate Foreign Service officers who died while serving in the Foreign Service, or died during the preceding year. DACOR reserves a memorial section in the cemetery, dedicated in 1964, and a flagpole monument inscribed "In Remembrance of Their Service to Their Country" honoring the diplomatic corps. Over 1,100 members and family members have been interred in this section. Members of DACOR and their family members may be interred in this section.

== Impact and advocacy ==
DACOR is closely associated with the Washington diplomatic community due to its proximity to the State Department. In 2025, the Foreign Service Journal described DACOR as "an intellectual gathering place for the discussion of international affairs." DACOR occasionally advocates collectively on behalf of the retired diplomatic community. On May 28, 2021, DACOR authored a letter to the editor published in The Washington Post, which called upon the State Department to undertake a "science-based, data-driven investigation" of the anomalous health incidents experienced by certain American diplomats posted overseas.

== Career development ==
Annually, the DACOR–Bacon House Foundation awards approximately $250,000 in scholarship and fellowship funding, across six scholarship programs including the Gantenbein Medical Fund Fellowship at $30,000 per year. DACOR also awards $10,000 tuition grants to approximately 11 graduate schools of international affairs, including the School of International Service at American University and the Schar School of Policy and Government at George Mason University.

Additionally, on September 10, 2021, DACOR signed a formal mentoring agreement with the University of the District of Columbia, a historically black university, to provide career mentorship from retired ambassadors to students from underrepresented groups pursuing a career in the Foreign Service.

== Bicentennial celebration ==
In 2025, DACOR celebrated the bicentennial of the completion of the Ringgold–Carroll House. On June 10, 2025, the U.S. Senate adopted a resolution designating June 10, 2025, as "DACOR Bacon House Bicentennial Day" to recognize the house as a "cornerstone of stability in the President's neighborhood" and as a significant component of America's diplomatic and judicial history. The celebrations of the bicentennial of the DACOR–Bacon House began in June 2025 and continued throughout the remainder of the year and consisted of a series of public lectures on the history of Foggy Bottom during the Civil War and a fundraising gala to benefit the DACOR–Bacon House Preservation Fund.

== Governance ==
A Board of Governors and a President govern DACOR. The President of DACOR as of 2026 is Ambassador Thomas A. Shannon Jr., who formerly served as the Under Secretary of State for Political Affairs.

== See also ==
- American Academy of Diplomacy
- American Foreign Service Association
- Association for Diplomatic Studies and Training
- Council on Foreign Relations
- Ringgold–Carroll House
- United States Foreign Service
