= National Foreign Affairs Training Center =

United States diplomat training facility

Coordinates: 38.867647°N 77.101536°W

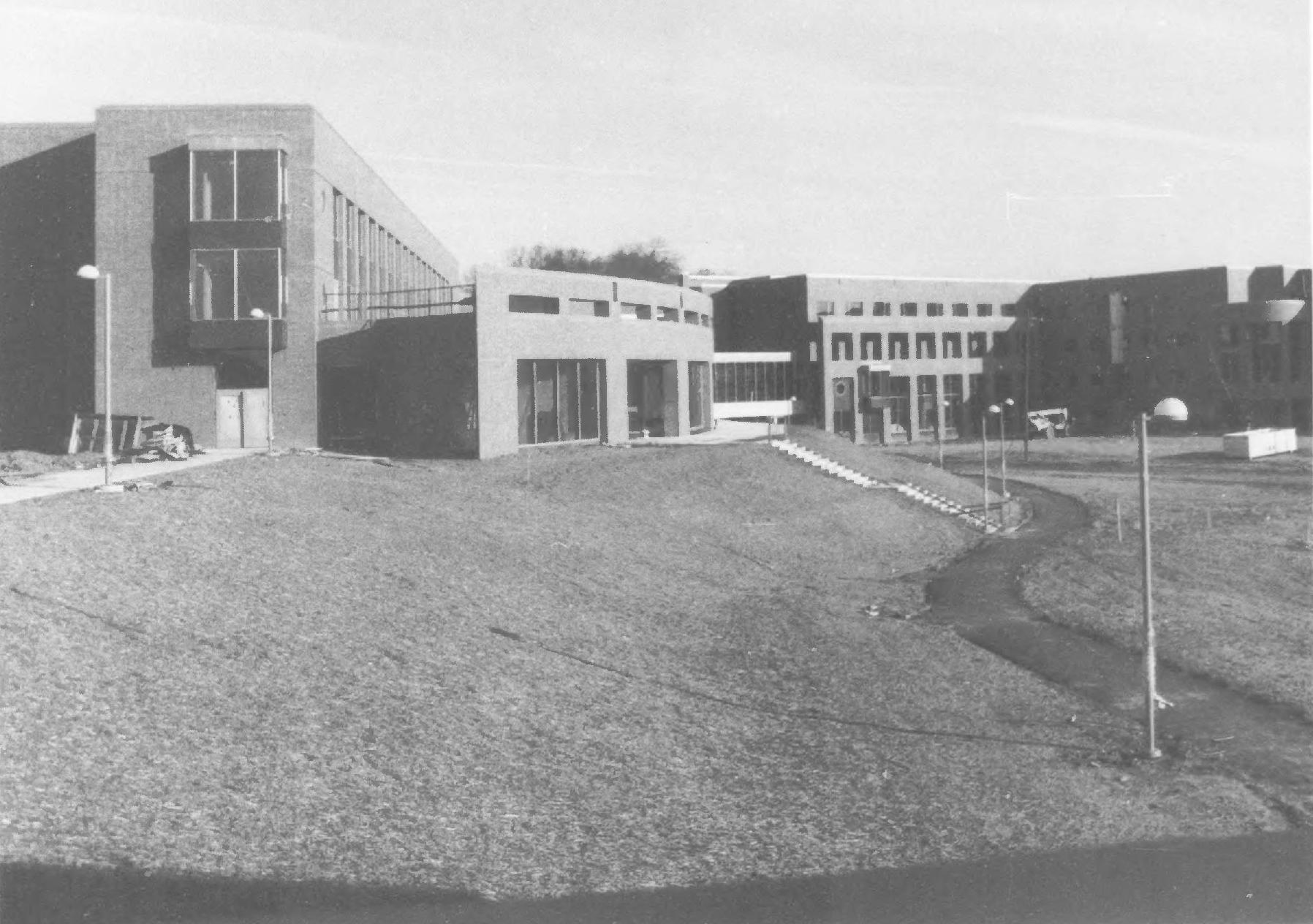
- NFATC (before completion), 1993
- Alternative names: George P. Schultz National Foreign Affairs Training Center

General information
- Location: Arlington Hall, Arlington, Virginia, U.S.
- Owner: Foreign Service Institute

The George P. Shultz National Foreign Affairs Training Center (NFATC) is one of several locations that house the Foreign Service Institute (FSI), the United States government's training school for members of the U.S. foreign affairs community. It is located at Arlington Hall in Arlington, Virginia.

== History ==
The area was originally developed in 1927 as a residential junior college for women called Arlington Hall. Due to dwindling enrollment and the economic ramifications of the Great Depression, Arlington Hall was sold to the U.S. Army Signal Command in 1941. During and following World War II, Arlington Hall was a military intelligence center and employed over 8,000 people.

== See also ==
- George Shultz
- A-100 class
- Foreign Service Institute
