= List of Smithsonian museums =

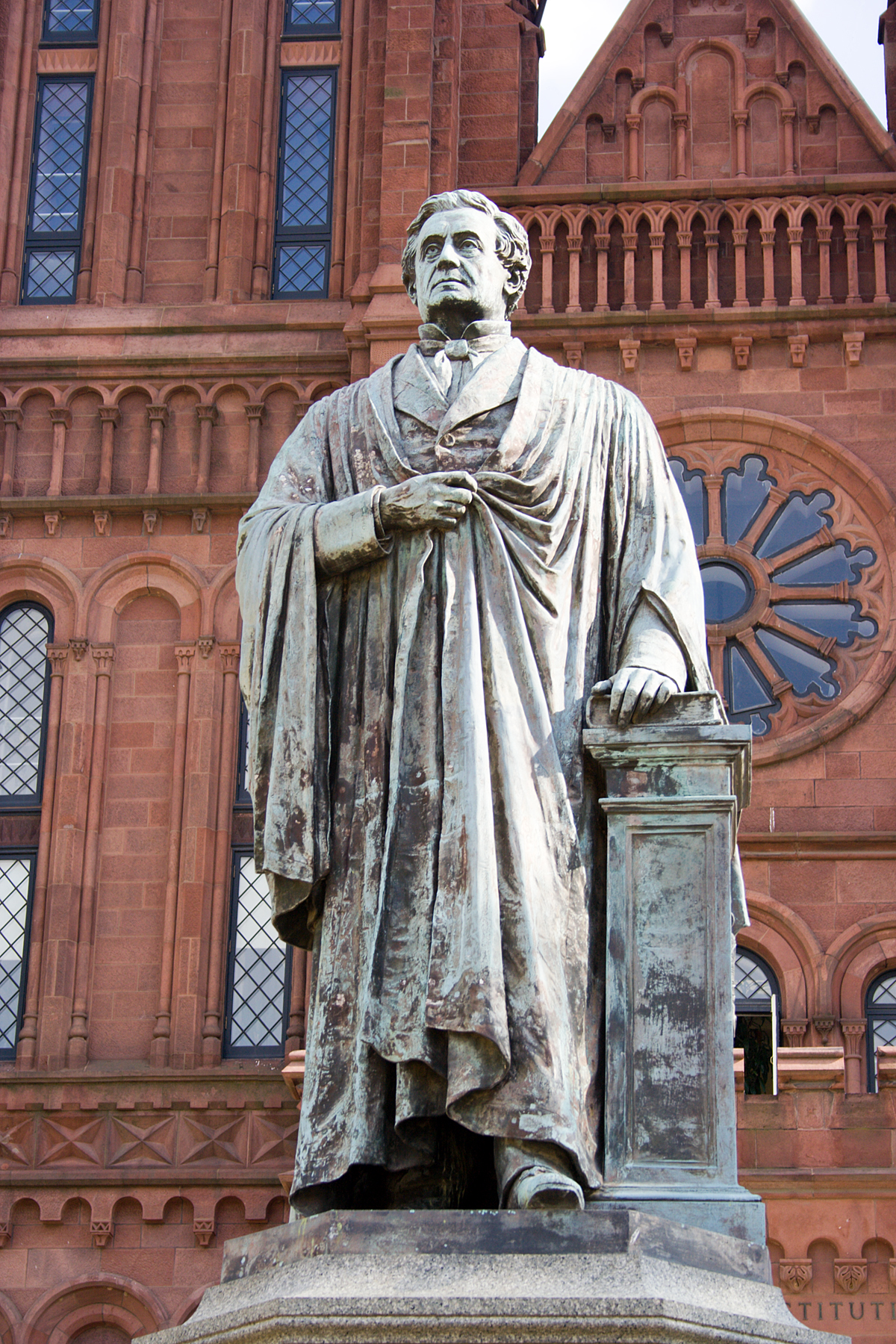
Statue of Joseph Henry, the first Secretary of the Smithsonian Institution, in front of the Smithsonian Institution Building

The Smithsonian museums are the most widely visible part of the United States' Smithsonian Institution and consist of 20 museums and galleries as well as the National Zoological Park. 17 of these collections are located in Washington, D.C., with 11 of those located on the National Mall. The remaining ones are in New York City and Chantilly, Virginia. The Arts and Industries Building is only open for special events.

The birth of the Smithsonian Institution can be traced to the acceptance of James Smithson's legacy, willed to the United States in 1826. Smithson died in 1829, and in 1836, President Andrew Jackson informed Congress of the gift, which it accepted. In 1838, Smithson's legacy, which totaled more than $500,000, was delivered to the United States Mint and entered the Treasury. After eight years, in 1846, the Smithsonian Institution was established.

The Smithsonian Institution Building (also known as "The Castle") was completed in 1855 to house an art gallery, a library, a chemical laboratory, lecture halls, museum galleries, and offices. During this time the Smithsonian was a learning institution concerned mainly with enhancing science and less interested in being a museum. Under the second secretary, Spencer Fullerton Baird, the Smithsonian turned into a full-fledged museum, mostly through the acquisition of 60 boxcars worth of displays from the Centennial Exposition in Philadelphia. The income from the exhibition of these artifacts allowed for the construction of the National Museum, which is now known as the Arts and Industries Building. This structure was opened in 1881 to provide the Smithsonian with its first proper facility for public display of the growing collections.

The Institution grew slowly until 1964 when Sidney Dillon Ripley became secretary. Ripley managed to expand the institution by eight museums and increased admission from 10.8 million to 30 million people a year. This period included the greatest and most rapid growth for the Smithsonian, and it continued until Ripley's resignation in 1984. Since the completion of the Arts and Industries Building, the Smithsonian has expanded to twenty separate museums with roughly 137 million objects in their collections, including works of art, natural specimens, and cultural artifacts. The Smithsonian museums are visited by over 25 million people every year.

== Museums ==
11 of the 20 Smithsonian Institution museums and galleries are at the National Mall in Washington, D.C., the open-area national park in Washington, D.C. running between the Lincoln Memorial and the United States Capitol, with the Washington Monument providing a division slightly west of the center. Six other Smithsonian museums including the National Zoo are located elsewhere in Washington. Two more Smithsonian museums are located in New York City, and one is located in Chantilly, Virginia.

The Smithsonian also holds close ties with over 200 museums in all 50 states, as well as Panama and Puerto Rico. These museums are known as Smithsonian Affiliates. Collections of artifacts are given to these museums in the form of long-term loans from the Smithsonian. These long-term loans are not the only Smithsonian exhibits outside the Smithsonian museums. The Smithsonian also has a large number of traveling exhibitions. Each year more than 50 exhibitions travel to hundreds of cities and towns all across the United States.

Authorization to create two additional museums, the National Museum of the American Latino and the Smithsonian American Women's History Museum, passed Congress in 2020 as part of the Consolidated Appropriations Act, 2021. The museums have not yet been created; when the bill was passed, the Smithsonian had two years to select the museums' locations on or near the National Mall. Four possible sites were selected in 2022.

| Institution | Type of collection | Location | Opened | Picture | Ref. |
|---|---|---|---|---|---|
| Anacostia Community Museum | African American culture | Washington, D.C. Anacostia | 1967 | A black and white picture of a one-story brick building. The entrance door is in the center of the building and three rows of white diamond shaped tiles decorate either side. | |
| Arthur M. Sackler Gallery (affiliated with the Freer Gallery) | Asian art | Washington, D.C. National Mall | 1987 | A one-story symmetrical granite building with two green peaked roofs either side of center. The entrance door is on the left and a similar design is on the right made out of a slightly darker granite. | |
| Arts and Industries Building | Special event venue | Washington, D.C. National Mall | 1881 | A long brick building is partial obscured by three trees. There is a central entranceway flanked by two towers, and a rotunda behind the entrance. | |
| Cooper Hewitt, Smithsonian Design Museum (Note: Located in the Andrew Carnegie Mansion.) | Design history | New York City; Museum Mile | 1897 | A three-story brick and stone building sits on a corner in New York City and is surrounded by a stone and wrought iron fence. | |
| Freer Gallery of Art (affiliated with the Sackler Gallery) | Asian art | Washington, D.C. National Mall | 1923 | The entrance to a one-story stone Beaux Arts style building. It consists of three large arches with stairs going up to and through them. The entrance door sits behind the middle arch. | |
| Hirshhorn Museum and Sculpture Garden | Contemporary and modern art | Washington, D.C. National Mall | 1974 | A large, convexly curving, 3 story tall, gray wall punctured on the second floor by a long strip of windows and a short balcony. A large black and white sculpture of a paint stroke sits in front of the building, stretching from the ground to the balcony | |
| National Air and Space Museum | Aviation and spaceflight history | Washington, D.C. National Mall | 1946, 1976 (Note: Year museum moved to current building) | An angled view of a long, modern, stone building with seven bays, every other one being one story taller than the previous. | |
| National Air and Space Museum's Steven F. Udvar-Hazy Center | Aviation and spaceflight history | Chantilly, Virginia | 2003 | A large white building that resembles an airplane hangar. There is a large parking lot in the front with an enclosed glass bridge connecting it to the building. | |
| National Museum of African American History and Culture | African-American history and culture | Washington, D.C. National Mall | 2003, 2016 | A three tiered golden colored building with no visible windows and a green lawn in front. | |
| National Museum of African Art | African art | Washington, D.C. National Mall | 1964, 1987 | A one-story symmetrical granite building with two green domed roofs either side of center. The entrance door is on the right and a similar design is on the left made out of a slightly darker granite. | |
| National Museum of American History | American history | Washington, D.C. National Mall | 1964 | An oblique view of a white stone modernist building. The facade steps forward and then back 9 times, spread out equally across its front. | |
| National Museum of the American Indian | Native American history and art | Washington, D.C. National Mall | 2004 | A large curving beige stone building with bands of windows delineating each floor. The curving roof line extends out beyond the building and steps back twice to reach the rest of the structure. | |
| National Museum of the American Indian's George Gustav Heye Center (Note: Located in the Alexander Hamilton U.S. Custom House.) | Native American history and art | New York City; Bowling Green | 1994 | An oblique view of a gray stone neoclassical building. There are 12 columns across the front of the building spaced equally except for the corners and on either side of the central door where they are doubled up. | |
| National Museum of Natural History | Natural history | Washington, D.C. National Mall | 1858, 1911 | An aerial view of a white stone neoclassical building. There is a large brown dome towards the front and center of the building where the entrance is. | |
| National Portrait Gallery | Portraiture | Washington, D.C. Penn Quarter | 1968 | A 3-story building. The first story is granite, while the second two are sandstone. There is a pedimented front with columns spanning the second and third floors and the entrance on the first. | |
| National Postal Museum | United States Postal Service; postal history; philately | Washington, D.C. NoMa | 1993 | A white stone, classically designed, 4 story building. Doors are located at the corners of the building, on the second story with a grand staircase up to it, and are flanked by two ionic columns. | |
| Renwick Gallery | American craft and decorative arts | Washington, D.C. Lafayette Square | 1972 | A 3-story, brick and red stone, second empire style building with a slate roof. The building is symmetrical with the entrance center and a blue and yellow banner on either side. | |
| Smithsonian American Art Museum | American art | Washington, D.C. Penn Quarter | 1968 | A 3-story building. The first story is granite, while the second two are sandstone. There is a pedimented front with columns spanning the second and third floors and the entrance on the first. | |
| Smithsonian Institution Building (The Castle) | Visitor center and offices | Washington, D.C. National Mall | 1855 | A brick building, reminiscent of a castle, slightly obscured by bare trees. There is a large central tower with the entrance at its base as well as smaller tower at each corner of the building, each with a varying design. | |
| National Zoological Park (National Zoo) | Zoo | Washington, D.C. Rock Creek Park | 1889 | A 3 small square garden backed by a black iron fence with a cement statue of the word "ZOO" at its center.Two green banners with monkeys on them hang behind. | |

Notes

Interactive map

Smithsonian museums on the National Mall:
1 - National Museum of African American History and Culture

2 - National Museum of American History
3 - National Museum of Natural History
4 - Smithsonian Institution Building (The Castle)
5 - Freer Gallery of Art
6 - Arthur M. Sackler Gallery
7 - National Museum of African Art
8 - Arts and Industries Building
9 - Hirshhorn Museum and Sculpture Garden
10 - National Air and Space Museum

11 - National Museum of the American Indian

Smithsonian museums beyond the National Mall:

12 - Renwick Gallery

13 - National Portrait Gallery
14 - Smithsonian American Art Museum
15 - National Postal Museum
16 - National Zoological Park (National Zoo)
17 - Anacostia Community Museum
18 - National Air and Space Museum's Steven F. Udvar-Hazy Center
19 - National Museum of the American Indian's George Gustav Heye Center

20 - Cooper Hewitt, Smithsonian Design Museum

Other museum sites on the National Mall:

A - National Gallery of Art Sculpture Garden

B - National Gallery of Art West Building

C - National Gallery of Art East Building

== See also ==
- List of museums in Washington, D.C.
- Architecture of Washington, D.C.
