= A-100 class =

United States foreign service training course

A-100 is the colloquial name given to the introductory/orientation training class for incoming Foreign Service Officers. These courses are taught in the Foreign Service Institute at the National Foreign Affairs Training Center in Arlington, Virginia. The purpose of the class is to provide orientation to the United States Department of State, information on embassy operation and foreign affairs, intelligence collection and dissemination, State Department computer systems, and the roles different categories of personnel perform in the conduct of diplomacy. It is the basic job-orientation course for the United States Foreign Service before diplomats branch off into different career tracks or geographic specialties.

== Training ==
The class ranges from five to six weeks long and typically has between 75 and 100 students. The first week of the class is devoted to security briefings, the issuing of laptops and State Department identification cards, and indoctrination into the more classified aspects of the Foreign Service. The class is an opportunity to learn about the Foreign Service, not a discussion forum for foreign policy; as public servants, Foreign Service Officers, when acting in their official capacity, are obligated to defend publicly and to implement the foreign policy directives and objectives of the federal government of the United States, notwithstanding any personal or political reservations.

Subsequent weeks examine State Department organizational structure, drafting and editing, the organizational structure of an Embassy, public speaking, and protocol. While the majority of the class takes place at the National Foreign Affairs Training Center, there are some field trips to other U.S. government foreign affairs agencies, as well as off site team-building training that lasts for two days and normally takes place at a military base in West Virginia.

Towards the end of the course, students are informed of their first assignments, usually overseas, during the "Flag Day" ceremony, so named because they are presented with a small flag of the country to which they have been assigned. After A-100, additional training is personalized to the individual depending on his or her overseas posting and/or language ability and post requirements.

Members often maintain contact with each other throughout their entire careers, and regard A-100 classmates much like high school or college classmates. A-100 classes are numbered sequentially. The class numbers were restarted with the enactment of the Foreign Service Act of 1980, and several groups have shared numbers over the years.

== History ==
In function, if not name, the A-100 Class dates back to June 7, 1924, when President Coolidge issued Executive Order 4022 establishing a Foreign Service School for the purpose of training newly hired probationary Foreign Service Officers (FSOs). The Foreign Service School's first class was conducted from April 20 until September 1, 1925, and "graduated" a class of 17.

According to tradition, the "100" in A-100 refers to the number of the room in which the course was first conducted. The State Department's 1926 Telephone Directory confirms that the Foreign Service School was located in Room 100 of the State, War, and Navy Building.

Additional details can be found in Ambassador Ellis O. Briggs' autobiography: Proud Servant: The Memoirs of a Career Ambassador. Ambassador Briggs recounts his experiences in preparing for the 1925 Foreign Service examination—the written and oral tests that were instituted after the Rogers Act of 1924 established the Foreign Service as "a competitive, nonpolitical, professional career". Ambassador Briggs says that "simultaneously there came into existence in the Department of State, in Room 100 on the ground floor of the old State War Navy Building, a modest enterprise called the Foreign Service School". He goes on to explain that, in order to provide new officers with an initial "home office indoctrination" and avoid the problems that might result if officers' initial training was entirely entrusted to overseas supervisors whose quality and interest level "varied from post to post", it was decided to organize "a course of several months in the State Department before a new officer was sent to his first foreign assignment". Ambassador Briggs concludes that "until after World War II, the Foreign Service School remained an unpretentious institution, concentrating on unraveling consular regulations and language instruction".

With the Foreign Service Act of 1946 a new Foreign Service training program, patterned after programs in the Army and Navy, came into existence. The newly established Foreign Service Institute (FSI) included a "School of Basic Officer Training" (with classes distinguished by the letter "B" preceding a three-digit course number). An "A" prefix was used to identify courses administered by the separate "School of Advanced Officer Training". FSI's 1949 Course Catalog includes "B 100"—a basic training course prescribed for all newly appointed Foreign Service officers. The separate "A 100" course involved three months of intensive training for Foreign Service officers following the successful conclusion of their probationary years in the field.

By 1955, however, these separate schools had been eliminated. In the 1955–56 FSI course catalog, the training programs for junior, mid-level, and senior-level officers are all found under the heading of "General Career Training". The B-100 course had vanished, but A-100 survived as the three-month "Junior Foreign Service Officers' Course" which was "required of all newly appointed Foreign Service officers of class 6 before assignment to their first post abroad". By 1963, the course had been retitled "Basic Foreign Service Officer's Course."

== See also ==
- United States Foreign Service
- United States Department of State
- Foreign Service Officer

== References and notes ==
- Proud Servant: The Memoirs of a Career Ambassador by Ellis O. Briggs 1998, 464 pp, ISBN 0-87338-588-8
