= Phoebe Farris =

Academic

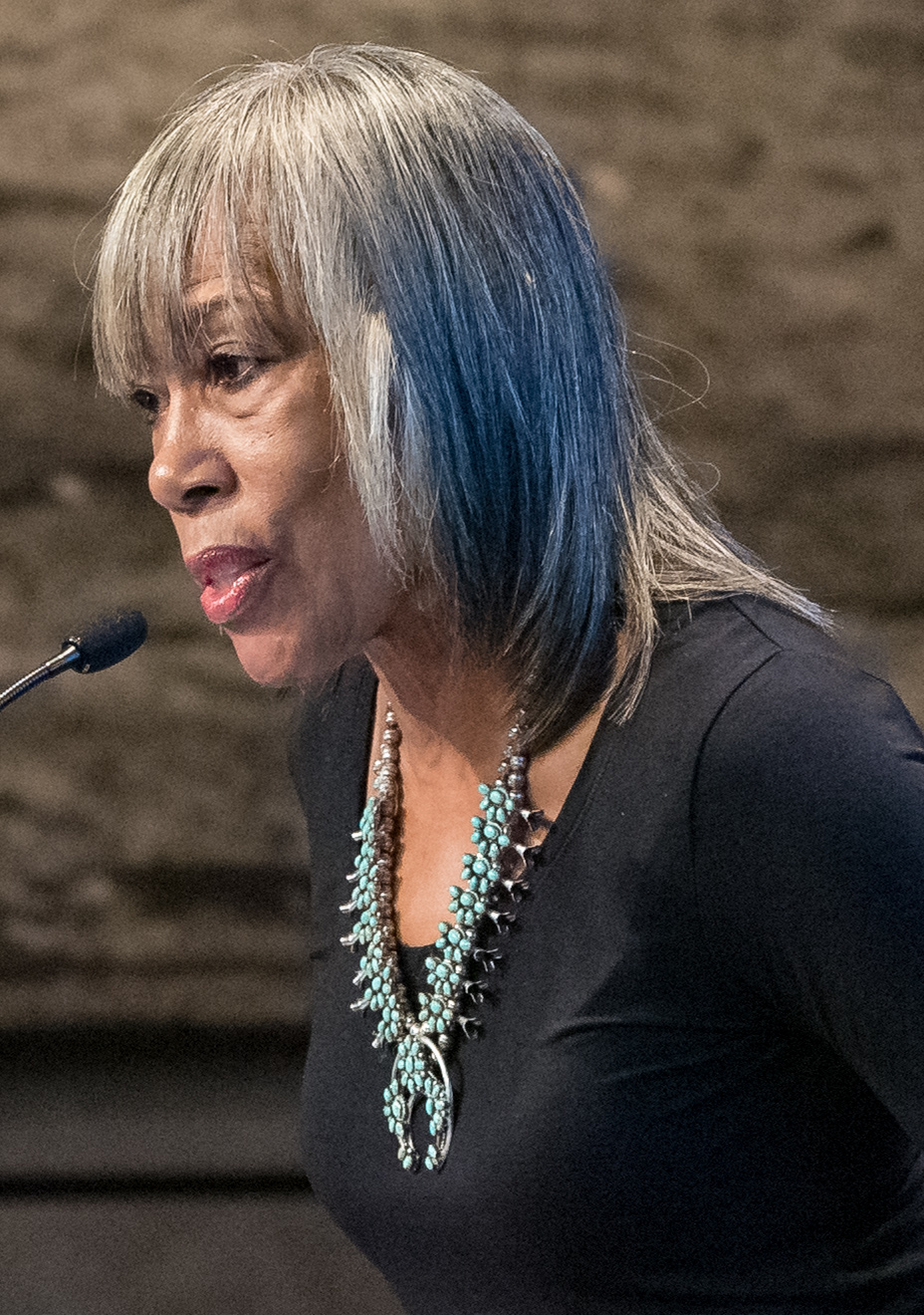
Phoebe Farris at a naming ceremony for 2014 MU69

Phoebe Farris (also published as Pheobe Farris-Dufrene) is an art therapist, author, editor, artist, academic, photographer, free lance arts critic, and curator. Farris received Fulbright and National Endowment of the Humanities grants and was named a Rockefeller Scholar in Residence. She was a resident at Harvard University’s Institute on the Arts and Civic Dialogue and at the Women’s Leadership Institute at Mills College, she earned an international reputation in the field of women’s studies. She identifies as a Powhatan-Renape/Pamunkey Native American. She taught at Purdue University for 22 years, and is now a professor emerita. The Phoebe Farris papers are held in the Purdue University Libraries, Archives and Special Collections. She has regularly authored articles in Cultural Survival Quarterly.

Farris received a bachelor's degree in fine arts from the City University of New York, a master's degree in art therapy from Pratt Institute and a doctorate in art education from the University of Maryland.

Farris has exhibited her documentary photography all over the world and curated traveling exhibits, including Visual Power: 21st Century Native American Artists/Intellectuals for the US Department of State. Since the 1980's, the subjects of her work have focused on documentation of contemporary Native American culture east of the Mississippi River and in the Caribbean.

== Published work ==
- Art Therapy And Psychotherapy: Blending Two Therapeutic Approaches
- Voices of Color: Art and Society in the Americas
- Women Artists of Color: A Bio-Critical Sourcebook to 20th Century Artists in the Americas
- Mentors of Diversity
