= Fondo del Sol =

Museum in Washington, D.C.

Fondo del Sol Visual Arts Center
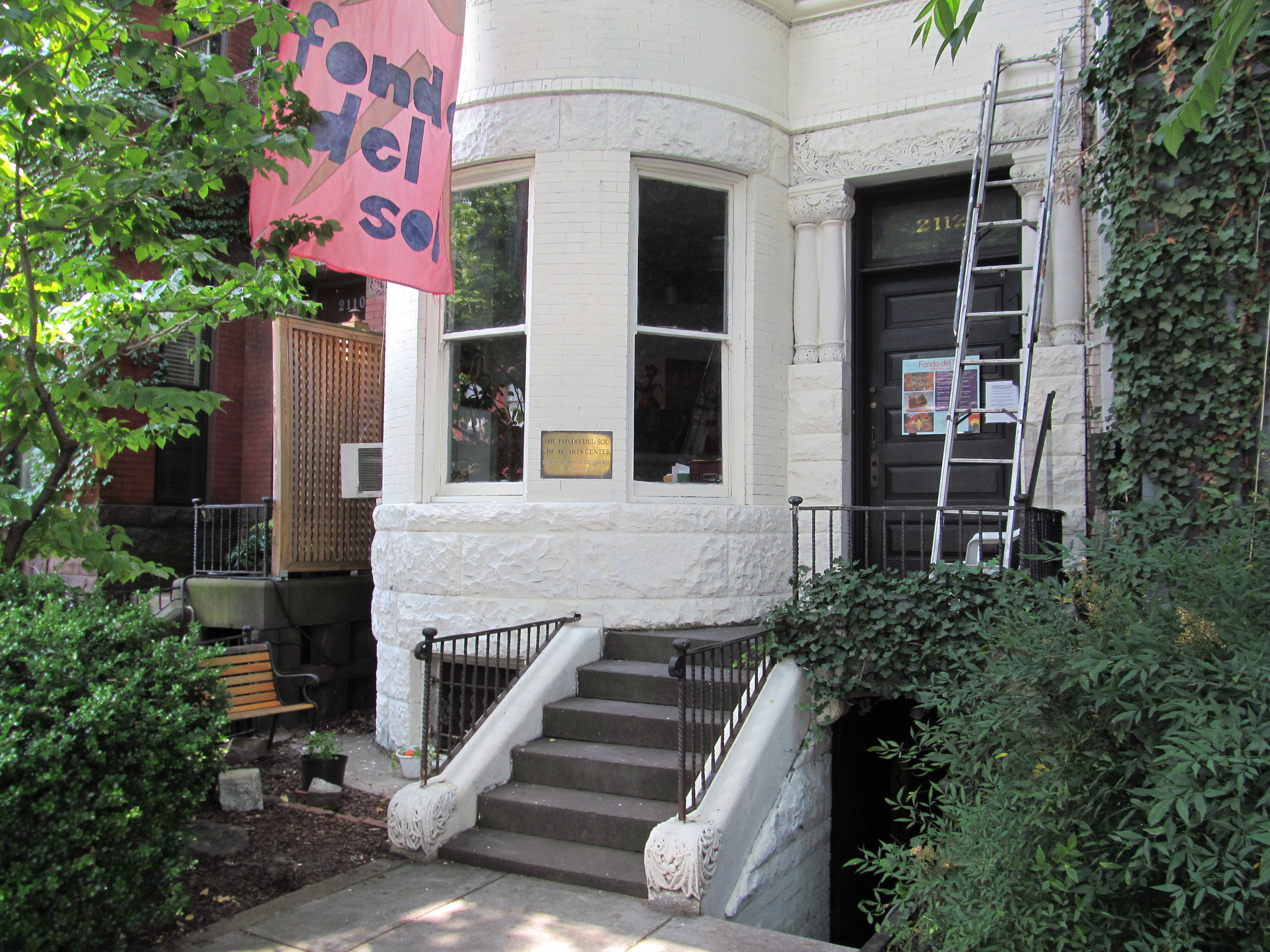

- Location within Washington, D.C.
- Established: 1973
- Location: Washington, D.C.
- Coordinates: 38.912372°N 77.047363°W
- Public transit access: Dupont Circle
- Website: www.fondodelsol.org

Fondo del Sol Visual Arts Center, founded in 1973, was a non-profit visual arts center in Washington, D.C. It was the second oldest Latino multicultural museum in the United States. The center, whose focus was on the art and cultural heritage of the people of the Americas, was D.C.'s only multilingual museum and offered materials in English, French, Russian, and Spanish. Fondo del Sol was a member of the Dupont-Kalorama Museums Consortium.

The museum was artist-run and one of its annual highlights was the June Walk Week, a three-day audio-visual celebration of Hispanic art and culture.
