= National Museum of American Jewish Military History =

Museum in Washington D.C., U.S.

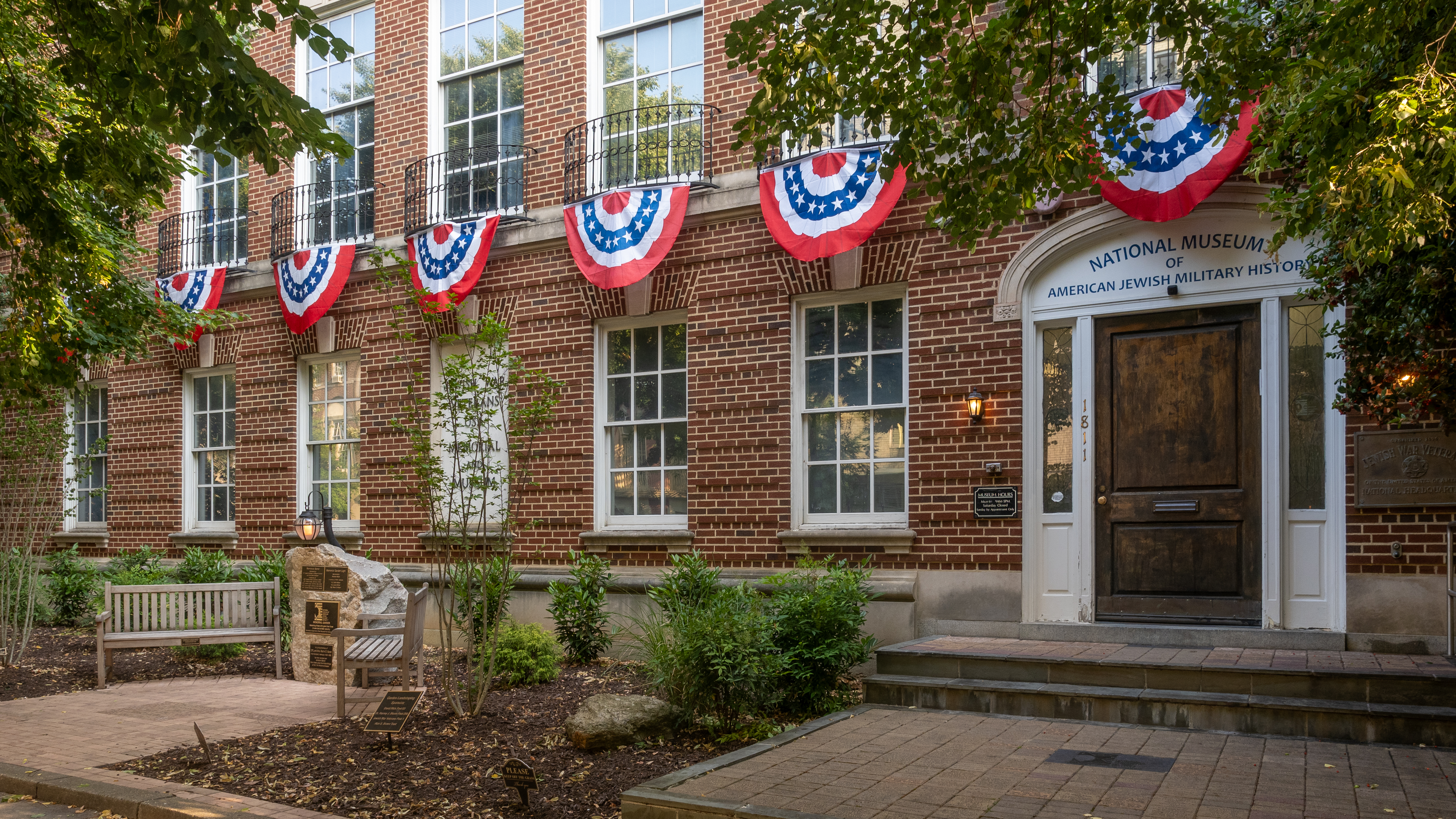

- Location within Washington, D.C. National Museum of American Jewish Military History (the United States)
- Established: September 2, 1958
- Location: 1811 R Street, NW, Washington, DC 20009-1603
- Coordinates: 38.912833°N 77.041917°W
- Public transit access: Dupont Circle
- Website: www.nmajmh.org

The National Museum of American Jewish Military History (NMAJMH) was founded September 2, 1958, in Washington, D.C., to document and preserve "the contributions of Jewish Americans to the peace and freedom of the United States...[and to educate] the public concerning the courage, heroism and sacrifices made by Jewish Americans who served in the armed forces." It operates under the auspices of the Jewish War Veterans of the United States of America (JWV), National Memorial, Inc. (NMI), and is located at 1811 R Street NW, Washington, D.C., in the Dupont Circle area, in the same building that houses the JWV National Headquarters.

It is a member institution of the Dupont-Kalorama Museums Consortium, established in 1983 to promote the "off the Mall" museums and their neighborhoods in the greater Dupont-Kalorama area of Washington, DC.

== Description ==
The museum includes two floors of permanent and special exhibitions, in addition to sponsoring a number of traveling displays that are temporarily displayed in other institutions throughout the United States. In addition to exhibitions, the museum features the Captain Joshua L. Goldberg Memorial Chapel and the Study Center that serves as site for the museum lecture series and other special programs. The museum's Honorial Wall and Tree of Honor are memorials recognizing individuals and organizations that contribute to the goals of the NMAJMH.

In addition to the museum's exhibits and memorials, the NMAJMH's archives serve as a resource for individuals who want to do further research on any topic related to American Jewish military history. The archival collection contains substantial materials on Jewish service in the American military, including original photographs, letters, diaries, military records, and manuscripts. The archives also contain materials relating to the history of the Jewish War Veterans of the U.S.A.

== History ==
Jewish War Veterans National Commander Paul Ginsberg urged JWV leaders gathered at the October 1951 National Executive Committee meeting to move JWV's headquarters from New York to Washington, DC, and suggested the new headquarters building include a shrine or memorial to Jewish American veterans. The memorial was envisioned as a repository for records and memorabilia relating to Jewish service in the American military, in addition to being a living memorial to the patriotism of American Jews. In 1954 the Jewish War Veterans purchased a building at 1712 New Hampshire Ave NW in Washington, DC. Along with moving their headquarters to this building the JWV also established the National Shrine to the Jewish War Dead.

On 2 September 1958, following the granting of a congressional charter, the Shrine became known as the Jewish War Veterans of the USA National Memorial, Inc. The museum's charter is registered as Public Law 85-3, HR 109. The museum and JWV relocated a final time in 1983, following the purchase of a building at 1811 R Street NW. The building was officially dedicated in 1984 by then Vice President George H.W. Bush.

Combating anti-Semitism, particularly charges that Jews are somehow less patriotic than other Americans, continues to be a goal of both the JWV and the NMAJMH. The museum – through its exhibitions, archives, and programs – documents of the long history of honorable and distinguished service of Jews in the American military from the Revolutionary War to the present.

== Exhibitions ==
The core exhibit, known as Jews in the American Military, covers the span of Jewish service in the American military - from the colonial era to the present. Permanent exhibitions include The Hall of Heroes: American Jewish Recipients of the Congressional Medal of Honor, and Major General Julius Klein: His Life and Work. Past and present special exhibitions have included such subjects as:

- Jewish War Veterans' Protest March Against Nazi Germany - 75th Anniversary
- Hidden Treasures: Selections from Our Permanent Collection
- Rescue & Renewal: GIs and Displaced Persons
- Women in the Military: A Jewish Perspective
- A Mother's Grief
- An American, A Sailor and A Jew: The Life and Career of Commodore Uriah Phillips Levy, USN (1792–1862)
- Gold Star Mothers, Wives and Sisters
- Jewish Americans in Military Service During Vietnam

Traveling exhibits have included:

- GIs Remember: Liberating the Concentration Camps
- Candid Moments in the Military
- Salute to Jewish Military Chaplains

== See also ==
- Jewish American military history
- Jewish War Veterans of the United States of America
- Naval Academy Jewish Chapel
- Lillian & Albert Small Jewish Museum
- Sixth & I Historic Synagogue
- United States Holocaust Memorial Museum
- Washington, D.C. Jewish Community Center
