= Ringgold–Carroll House =

Historic house in Washington, D.C., United States

- U.S. National Register of Historic Places
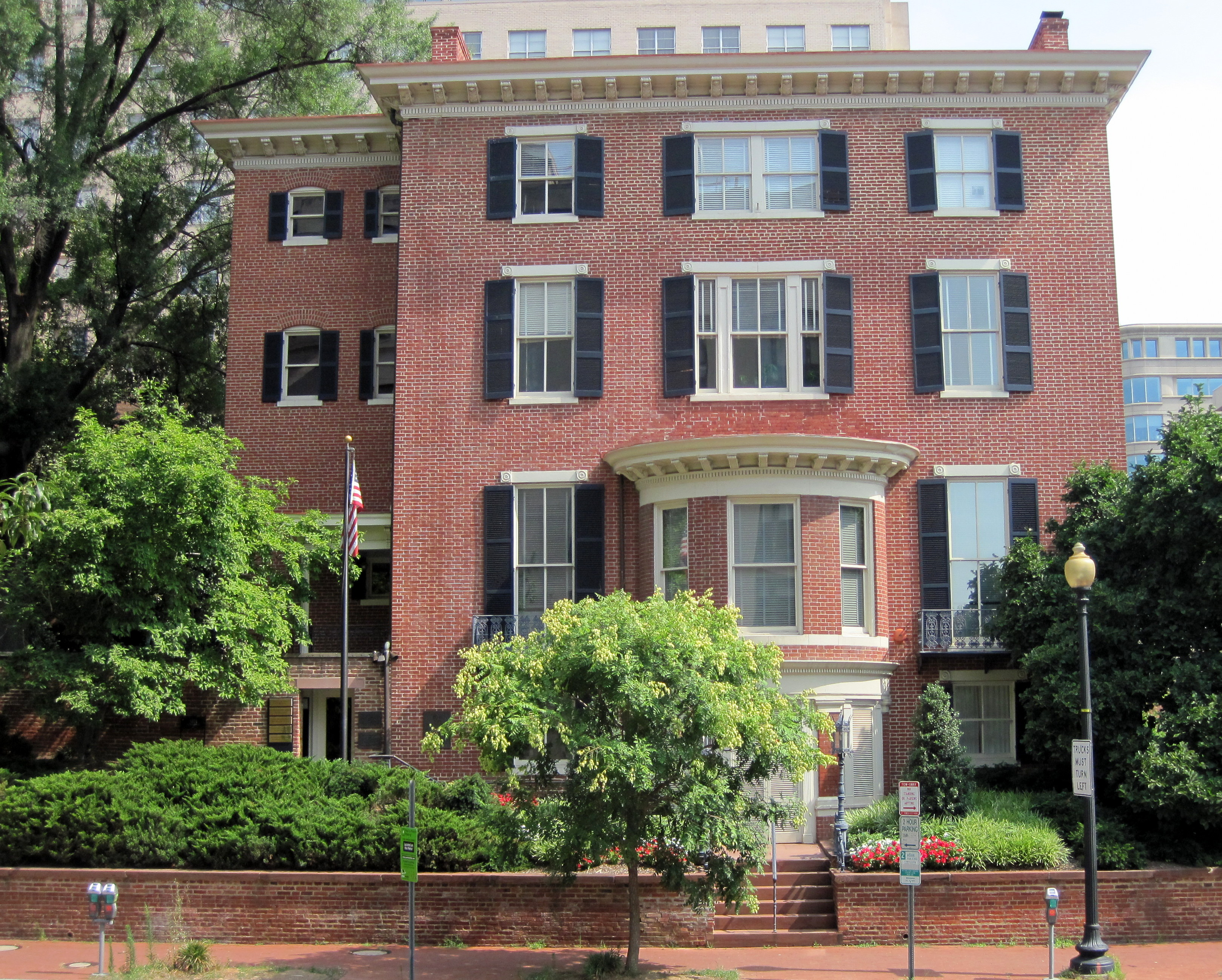
- Ringgold–Carroll House

- Location within Central Washington, D.C. Location within the District of Columbia Location within the United States
- Location: 1801 F St NW, Washington, D.C.
- Coordinates: 38°53′51″N 77°2′30.9″W
- Built: 1825
- Architectural style: Federal
- Website: https://www.dacorbacon.org
- NRHP reference No.: 73002114
- Added to NRHP: July 26, 1973

The Ringgold–Carroll House (also formerly known as the John Marshall House and now known as the DACOR–Bacon House) is a historic residence located at 1801 F St Northwest, Washington, D.C. One of the finest of the few remaining examples of Federal period residential architecture in the neighborhood of the White House, it is listed on the National Register of Historic Places. It has been adapted from a historic home into a private club and office space by Diplomatic and Consular Officers, Retired (DACOR) and the DACOR–Bacon House Foundation.

== History ==
It was built in 1825 for Tench Ringgold, who was one of a three-member presidential commission charged with supervising the restoration of public buildings in the capital following the War of 1812 and the burning of Washington by the British. He was also still serving as US marshal in the District of Columbia, having first been appointed by President James Monroe.

From 1832 to 1833, the Chief Justice of the United States John Marshall boarded at the home, along with Associate Justice Joseph Story. Both men considered Ringgold a friend.

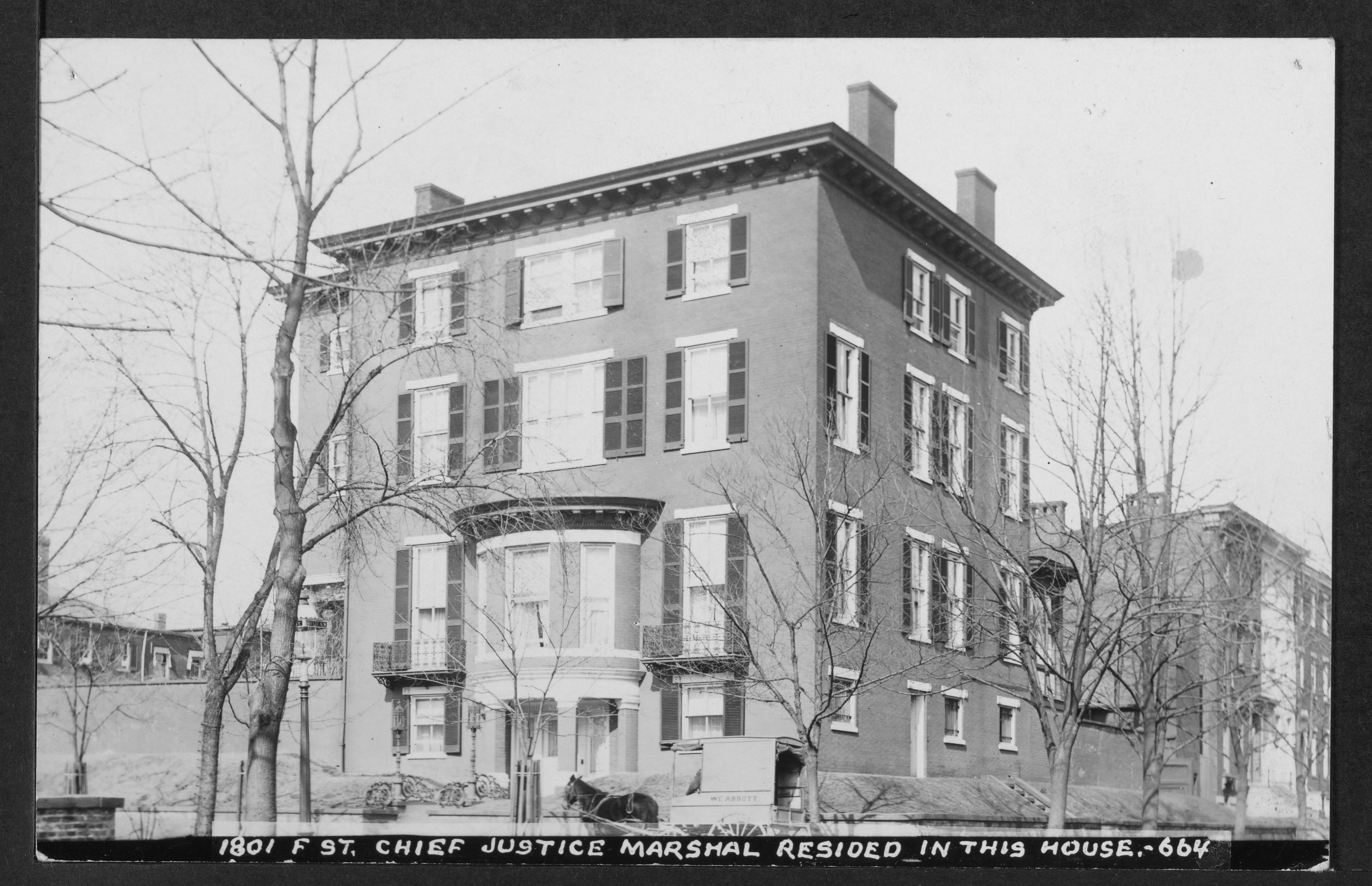
Ringgold–Carroll House in 1913

In 1835, the house was sold, and a number of prominent people have since lived in the house, including William Thomas Carroll, chief clerk of the Supreme Court, for whom the house is also named; Chief Justice Melville Fuller, Senator Joseph Medill McCormick, and Congressman Robert Low Bacon. Bacon's widow, philanthropist and political hostess Virginia Murray Bacon (among the grandest of 20th-century Washington's society "grandes dames"), established a foundation to ensure the house would continue in perpetuity as an elegant venue for statesmanship and international dialogue. DACOR merged with the Bacon House Foundation to preserve the house, which now serves as the Washington home of the foreign affairs community. The historic property is open to the public on Mondays, Wednesdays, and Thursdays from 2:30 to 4:30 p.m. for tours.

The house was successfully nominated for the National Register for Historic Places by the National Capital Planning Commission on July 26, 1973.

July 10, 2025 was designated by the Senate as "DACOR–Bacon House Bicentennial Day." The resolution cites the history of the house, including its origins on Anacostian land.

== See also ==
- National Register of Historic Places listings in Washington, D.C.
