= Inerting (gas) =

Introduction of inert gas to a closed system

In fire and explosion prevention engineering, inerting refers to the introduction of an inert (non-combustible) gas into a closed system (e.g. a container or a process vessel) to make a flammable atmosphere oxygen deficient and non-ignitable.

Inerting relies on the principle that a combustible (or flammable) gas is able to undergo combustion (explode) only if mixed with air in the right proportions. The flammability limits of the gas define those proportions, i.e. the ignitable range. In combustion engineering terms, the admission of inert gas can be said to dilute the oxygen below the limiting oxygen concentration.

Inerting differs from purging. Purging, by definition, ensures that an ignitable mixture never forms. Inerting makes an ignitable mixture safe by introduction of an inert gas.

== Certain inert gases are unsuitable for inerting ==
Because the mixture by definition is ignitable before inerting commence, it is imperative that the inerting procedure does not introduce a potential source of ignition, or an explosion will occur.

NFPA 77 states that carbon dioxide from high-pressure cylinders or fire extinguishers should never be used to inert a container or vessel. The release of carbon dioxide may generate static electricity with enough energy to ignite the mixture, resulting in an explosion. The release of CO_{2} for fire fighting purposes has led to several accidental explosions of which the 1954 Bitburg explosion may be the most devastating.

Other unsafe processes that may generate static electricity include pneumatic transport of solids, a release of pressurized gas with solids, industrial vacuum cleaners, and spray painting operations.

== Other uses ==
The term inerting is often loosely used for any application involving an inert gas, not conforming with the technical definitions in NFPA standards. For example, marine tankers carrying low-flash products like crude oil, naphtha, or gasoline have inerting systems on board. During the voyage, the vapor pressure of these liquids is so high, that the atmosphere above the liquid (the headspace) is too rich to burn, the atmosphere is unignitable. This may change during unloading. When a certain volume of liquid is drawn from a tank, a similar volume of air will enter the tank's headspace, potentially creating an ignitable atmosphere.

The inerting systems use an inert gas generator to supply inert make-up gas instead of air. This procedure is often referred to as inerting. Technically, the procedure ensures that the atmosphere in the tank's headspace remains unignitable. The gas mixture in the headspace is not inert per se, it's just unignitable. Because of its content of flammable vapors, it will burn if mixed with air. Only if enough inert gas is supplied as part of a purge-out-of-service procedure, will it be unable to burn when mixed with air.

== See also ==
- ATEX
- Flammability limits
- Limiting oxygen concentration
- Purging (gas)
- 1954 Bitburg explosion (jet fuel storage tank)
- The 1966 explosion of the naphtha tanker MV Alva Cape
