= Tex Harris =

American diplomat

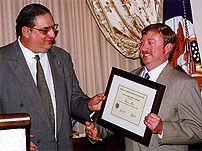
- Harris (left) as AFSA president in 1997

Consul General of the United States to Melbourne
- In office September 1997 – July 1999
- President: Bill Clinton

President of the American Foreign Service Association
- In office July 15, 1993 – 1997

Personal details
- Born: Franklyn Allen Harris; May 13, 1938
- Died: February 23, 2020 (aged 81)
- Height: 6 ft 7 in (201 cm)

Franklyn Allen "Tex" Harris (May 13, 1938 – February 23, 2020) was an American diplomat best known for his work as a political officer in the United States embassy to Argentina between 1977 and 1979, where he tracked the victims of "enforced disappearances" during the Dirty War of the Argentinian military dictatorship. Despite a lack of official support and even obstruction, his work proved consequential in exposing the junta's abuses and became a major influence on American foreign policy towards Argentina and human rights. He later served as consul to Melbourne, Australia and president of the American Foreign Service Association (AFSA) before his retirement in 1999. He would later become a model of constructive dissent in the Foreign Service, being granted the Distinguished Honor Award by the State Department and getting an award for constructive dissent by AFSA named after him.

== Early and personal life ==
Franklyn Allen Harris was born on May 13, 1938, in Glendale, California, and spend his childhood in Dallas, Texas. According to Harris, his father Murray (originally Shlimka Simselowitz) was a Russian Jew who fled from persecution there to Germany and later the United States. His surname was actually the result of a misunderstanding where Murray replied to a request for his name with "Herr S.", which was interpreted as "Harris". Additionally, Harris stated that his first name is spelled with a "y" (as opposed to "Franklin" with an "i") as the former was a "Republican" spelling while the latter was considered "Democratic". He graduated with a B.A. from Princeton in 1960 and a law degree from the University of Texas in 1965, where he gained an interest in human rights after joining a group of law students advocating for civil rights. The same year, he joined the State Department, and married Jeanie L. Roeder in 1966.

== Argentina ==
Harris was assigned to Argentina in 1977 as the embassy's human rights officer in the midst of the "National Reorganization Process", the military dictatorship that ruled the country between 1976 and 1983. The United States originally supported the regime due to its perceived stability following the "chaotic" rule of Isabel Perón. However, Harris soon learned that the "Dirty War" of state terrorism and human rights abuses perpetuated by the government, ostensibly to fight violent extremists, actually targeted many civilians who were dissidents, actual or alleged. The atrocities included "forced disappearances" on a large scale, but as the intelligence sections of the embassy blamed the disappearances on "extremists" on both sides rather than the government, relatives of the missing were not allowed inside the embassy and there were only a few records collected. Harris successfully campaigned for the families of the disappeared to be able to deliver testimony at the chancery itself. He went to one of the demonstrations by the Mothers of the Plaza de Mayo and handed out his contact info. At first, the Mothers didn't trust him, but eventually one came, leading to other family members of the disappeared coming as well.

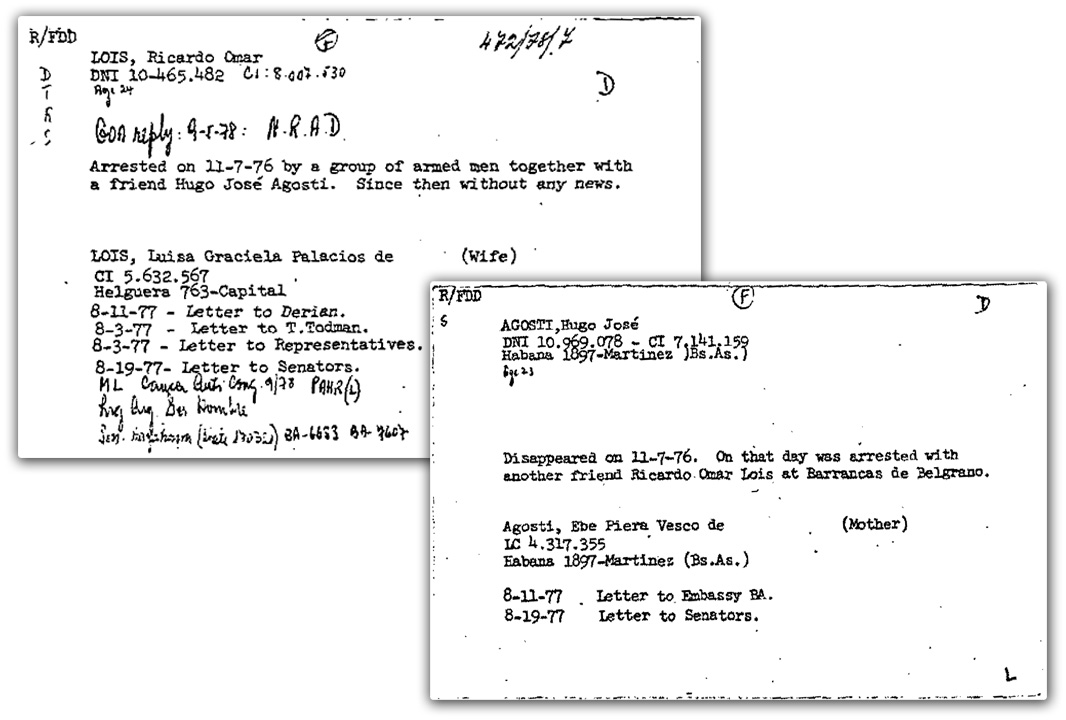
Cards used to record the victims of forced disappearances, with "D" marked in the top-right corner to signify "disappeared"

Eventually, many people would come to the embassy, with up to thirty to forty families coming per week. To assist him with collecting the data, Harris assigned his secretary Blanca Vollenweider, a Swiss-born Argentine librarian who had survived the Holocaust, to be his assistant. They established a system where relatives would come in, Vollenweider would get their basic information such as their names, Harris would then talk to them in greater detail, and they would record all information on index cards. The Argentinian government attempted to intimidate those who went in by using phone taps and filming everyone who went in and out of the embassy; nevertheless, Harris' records have been described as the most complete, with around 13,500 individual documents. The reports had immediate effect; Patricia M. Derian, at the time the Assistant Secretary of State for Human Rights and Humanitarian Affairs, used the data Harris and Vollenweider collected to put pressure on officials in both Washington and Buenos Aires, ultimately leading to Congress passing a law prohibiting military aid and arms sales to the country until the human rights situation improved. As his reports continued to be sent, he eventually started conflicting with other officers in the embassy as his demonstration of continuing human rights abuses was diplomatically inconvenient.

Harris was transferred out of Argentina in 1979, to which elite officials in the junta allegedly raised toasts.

== Later life and legacy ==
After his time in Argentina, Harris was reportedly denied advancement opportunities for several years in retaliation for his efforts there. In 1984, he was interviewed on television by Bill Moyers about his work. This broadcast would lead to him being bestowed with the William R. Rivkin Award by the American Foreign Service Association (AFSA) and a promotion.

Through the 1970s and 1980s, Harris worked on task forces that studied the negative impacts of climate change and environmental issues on diplomacy. He was stationed in South Africa during the country's transition from apartheid and led anti-HIV efforts as the deputy director of the Office of Southern African Affairs. He would later work in Venezuela and Australia, and served as the Consul General of the United States to Melbourne before his retirement. AFSA inaugurated the "F. Allen 'Tex' Harris Award for Constructive Dissent" in 2000 for Foreign Service specialists as a counterpart to similar awards for Foreign Service officers. He was also awarded the Order of the Liberator General San Martín in 2004 by then-president of Argentina Néstor Kirchner.

Harris died on February 23, 2020, at the age of 81. The Argentinian Ministry of Foreign Affairs and Worship expressed their regrets.
