= State university system =

Group of public universities supported by an individual state in the United States

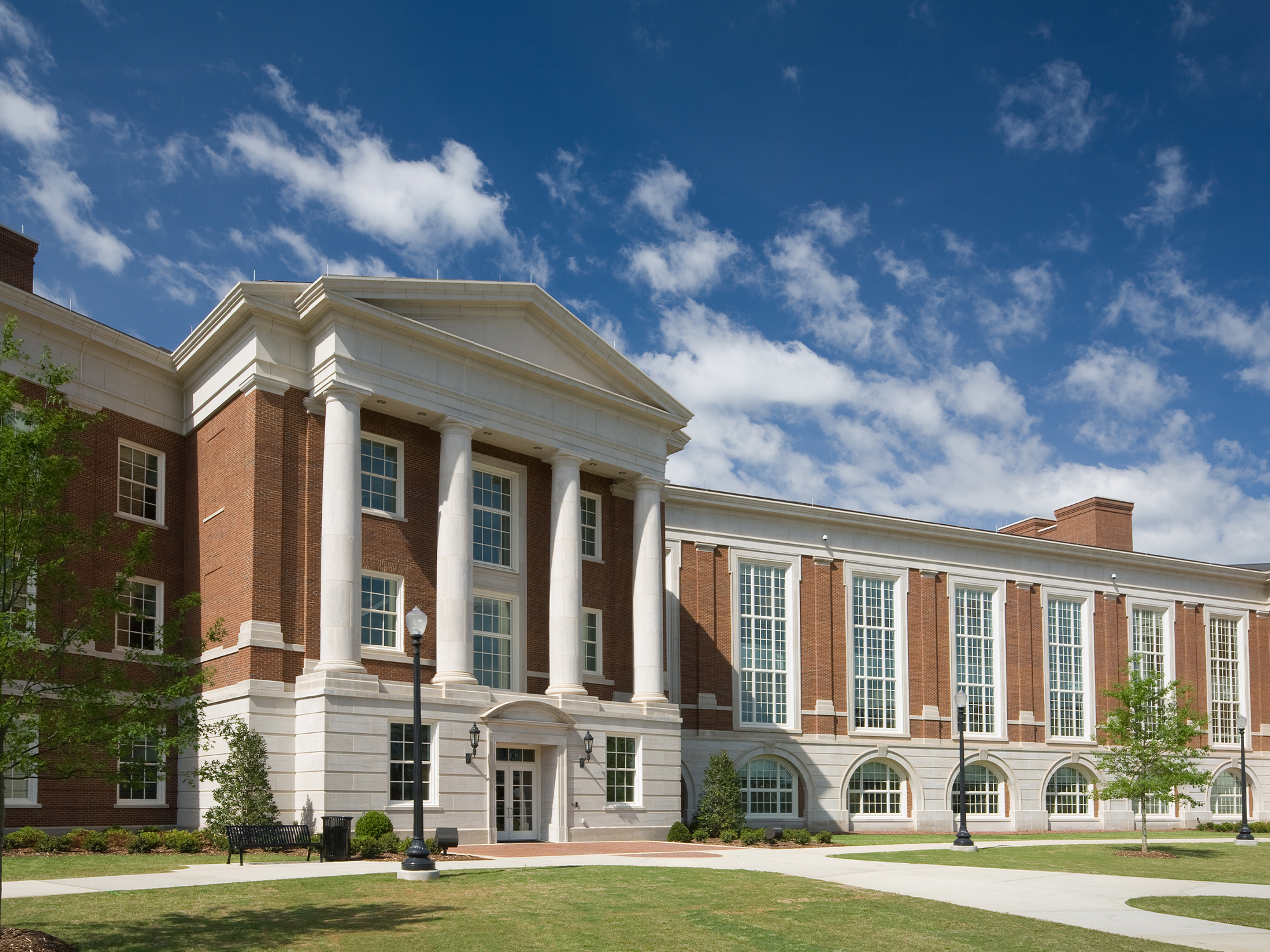
South Engineering Research Center, a College for Education in engineering within the University of Alabama.

A state university system in the United States is a group of public universities supported by an individual state, territory or federal district. These systems constitute the majority of universities in the country, serving by far the majority of the nation’s college students, and granting most of the degrees.

State university systems should not be confused with federally funded colleges and universities, at which attendance is limited to military personnel and government employees. Members of foreign militaries and governments also attend some schools. These schools include the United States service academies, Naval Postgraduate School, and military staff colleges.

A state university system normally means a single legal entity and administration, but may consist of several institutions, each with its own identity as a university. Some states—such as California and Texas—support more than one such system.

State universities get subsidies from their states. The amount of the subsidy varies from university to university and state to state, but the effect is to lower tuition costs below those of private universities for students from that state or district. As more Americans have attended college and private tuition rates have increased well beyond the rate of inflation, admission to state universities has become more competitive.

== History ==
State university systems were a product of the demand for higher education in the newly formed United States. The tradition of publicly funded state colleges began primarily in the southern states, where in the east and northeastern states other private educational institutions were already established. There remains significant debate about which institution or institutions are the oldest public universities in the United States.

The University of Georgia is the country's first chartered public university, established on January 27, 1785, by an act of the General Assembly of Georgia. However, the University of Georgia did not hold classes until 16 years later in the fall of 1801. The first collegiate-level classes conducted by a public institution were at another Georgia institution, the Academy of Richmond County, chartered in 1783 with instruction beginning in 1785. While the academy, later known as Augusta State University and now merged into Augusta University, was founded as a high school, it taught college-level classes from its creation, and its graduates were accepted into four-year colleges as sophomores or juniors, effectively making it a combination of a modern high school and community college. The school eventually dropped high school instruction, but remained a community college until becoming a four-year institution in 1963.

The University of North Carolina at Chapel Hill, while chartered four years after Georgia in 1789, was the first state university to hold classes. Classes began at UNC in 1795, and UNC is the only state university to have graduated students in the 18th century. The University of South Carolina was chartered in 1801 and held classes for the first time in 1805. The University of Tennessee was originally chartered as Blount College in 1794, but had a very difficult beginning—graduating only one student—and did not begin receiving the promised state funds until 1807 when it was renamed East Tennessee University.

Determining which state university was the "first" is further complicated by the case of New Jersey's state university system. Facing the embarrassment of being the only state left that had not established a state university, the New Jersey Legislature decided to commission an already existing private university as its state university, rather than build one from the ground up, as other states had done. Rutgers University, which had previously been a private school affiliated with the Dutch Reformed Church, was designated as a state university by acts of the legislature in 1945 and 1956. It became a 'System' with the absorptions of Newark University in 1946 and The College of South Jersey in 1950, becoming Rutgers' Newark and Camden campuses, respectively. Rutgers was chartered in 1766, nineteen years before the University of Georgia, but did not become the State University of New Jersey for another 179 years.

Castleton University in Vermont was the oldest state university in New England, chartered in 1787. This was soon followed by the charter of The University of Vermont (UVM) in 1791. However, neither institution was a "state university" in the modern sense of the term until many decades later. Castleton began as the Rutland County Grammar School. It did not become a postsecondary institution until the campus became home to the State Normal School in 1867. Although the school became state-supported at that time, its campus remained privately owned until 1912. UVM was chartered as a private institution and did not become a public university until 1865. The first institution in New England to actually operate as a public university is Westfield State University in Massachusetts, which has been public since its founding in 1838.

Consideration of public higher education was included in the earliest westward expansion of the U.S. with the Northwest Ordinance of 1787, which established the Northwest Territory. It stated: "Religion, morality, and knowledge, being necessary to good government and the happiness of mankind, schools and the means of education shall forever be encouraged." Ohio University (1804) was the first state school so established in the territory (and is also the oldest state university that has continuously operated as a public institution), with the other developing states similarly creating public universities to serve the citizens. On a national basis, the state university system was also assisted by the establishment of the Land-grant universities, under the Morrill Land-Grant Colleges Acts of 1862 and 1890.

Many state universities were founded in the middle 19th century, in particular supported by the Morrill Land-Grant Colleges Acts of 1862 and 1890.

Many state universities—such as UCLA, Arizona State, and SUNY Geneseo—were founded as normal schools.

Following the Second World War, many state universities were merged with smaller institutions to achieve economies of scale in administration and also to raise the prestige of the degrees granted by some smaller institutions. A prominent example of this is the State University of New York, which is the largest comprehensive system of universities, colleges, and community colleges in the United States.

During the 1970s, further mergers took place and the concept of a state system was widely adopted. Some states have more than one state university system. For example, California has the University of California and the California State University as four-year university systems, and the California Community Colleges as its community college system. Texas has seven state university systems (one of which currently consists of only one institution), plus one independent public university.

== Governance ==
There is much diversity between the states in terms of how governing power is distributed between boards of regents (or trustees), presidents, chancellors, provosts, and other senior university executives.

At one end of the spectrum is the University of California, in which each campus has a chancellor as its chief executive officer. All chancellors report as equals to a systemwide president, who in turn reports to a Board of Regents. At the other end is Kansas, where there is no true state university system with a systemwide brand identity and a systemwide chief executive officer empowered to establish uniform policies across multiple campuses and to supervise the chief executive officer of each campus. Instead, the Kansas Board of Regents directly supervises the presidents of all Kansas public universities.

There are several states with hybrid in-between arrangements, such as Hawaii, Indiana, and South Carolina, where the systemwide leader of the state university retains direct executive control over the original flagship campus but also supervises the leaders of all other campuses in the system. As R. Bowen Loftin has pointed out, this requires considerable tact on the part of the systemwide leader: "How would the other campus leaders see themselves in such an arrangement?" However, it is more common for the flagship campus to have its own leader distinct from the systemwide leader.

== State college system ==
Some states maintain a separate system for state colleges (often specified as community colleges, technical colleges, or junior colleges), distinct from their university system. Examples include the California Community Colleges System, the Florida College System, and the Technical College System of Georgia. In these states, colleges focus primarily on awarding two-year associate's degrees and professional certificates, while universities focus on four-year bachelor's degrees and more advanced degrees.

== Historic names ==
During the growth and restructuring of the state systems, names such as University of California have changed their meanings over time.

- In some cases, the unqualified name has become the official name of the university system that includes the institution which is the original bearer of the name. Examples include:
  - University of California, originally referring only to the campus at Berkeley
  - University of North Carolina, originally referring only to the campus at Chapel Hill
  - University of Puerto Rico, originally referring only to the campus at Río Piedras

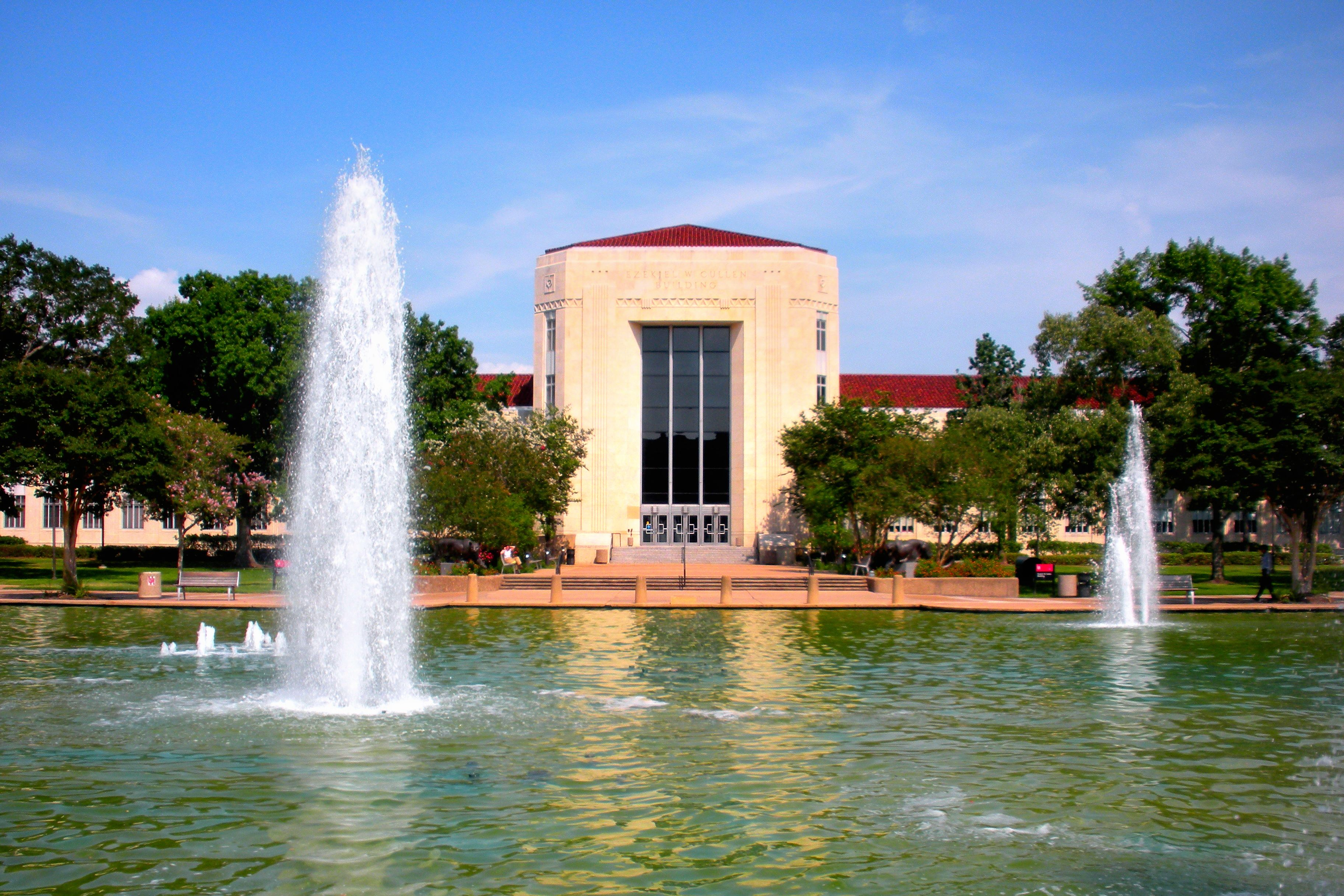
University of Houston

- In other cases, the unqualified name remains the official name of an individual institution which is now part of a larger university system. Examples include:
  - University of Alabama, flagship institution of the University of Alabama System
  - University of Houston, flagship institution of the University of Houston System
- In some cases, the unqualified name now has no official status, but is used informally for either an individual university (particularly in sporting and similar contexts) or for the university system of which it is now part (particularly in administrative and academic contexts). Examples include:
  - University of Texas, in Austin
  - University of Wisconsin, in Madison

== See also ==
- University system#United States
- Public university
- National university
- Argentine university reform of 1918
- List of community colleges
- List of state and territorial universities in the United States
