= Clemson University Graduate School =

University in Clemson, South Carolina, U.S.

- Type: Public
- Established: 1889
- Dean: John Lopes
- Academic staff: 1,264
- Administrative staff: 2,950
- Postgraduates: 5,688
- Location: Clemson, South Carolina, U.S.
- Campus: Rural, 17,000 acres (6,900 ha)
- Colors: Orange & purple
- Nickname: Tigers
- Sporting affiliations: NCAA Division I ACC; 19 varsity teams
- Website: www.clemson.edu/graduate

The Graduate School at Clemson University currently offers 110 graduate degree programs in 66 fields of study. Included in this total are 37 doctoral, 65 master's, and one educational specialist program.

Clemson University was founded in 1889, and the Graduate School was formally recognized in 1964. Since the inception of the Graduate School, approximately 25,000 graduate degrees have been awarded. Clemson has approximately 4,588 enrolled graduate students.

The university-including the Graduate School-is academically divided into seven colleges: Architecture, Arts and Humanities; Business; Behavioral, Social and Health Sciences; Engineering, Computing and Applied Science; Science; Education; and Agriculture, Forestry and Life Sciences.

Clemson is a public, coeducational, land-grant, research university located in Clemson, South Carolina, United States; this small city is in the foothills of the Blue Ridge Mountains and adjacent to Lake Hartwell, a recreational lake with a 1,000-mile (1,600 km) shoreline. The university is approximately two hours from each of Atlanta, Georgia and Charlotte, North Carolina, in the Greenville-Spartanburg-Anderson metropolitan area of over one-million people.

DesignIntelligence magazine named Clemson's architecture graduate program one of the nation's Top 10 programs among all public universities in 2014. In 2012, a total of 11 Clemson seniors and graduate students won the prestigious National Science Foundation Graduate Research Fellowship.

== Degree programs ==
The graduate school currently offers 110 graduate and professional degree programs in 66 fields of study. Included in this total are 37 doctoral, 65 master's, and one educational specialist program.
