= Oxygen concentration =

Oxygen concentration may refer to:

- What oxygen concentrators do - increase the fraction of oxygen in a gas mixture
- Oxygen saturation, the fraction of oxygen dissolved in or carried by a fluid
- Limiting oxygen concentration, the concentration below which combustion can not take place
