= Diplomats in Residence =

Diplomats in residence (DIRs) were career Foreign Service officers and Foreign Service specialists located throughout the U.S. who provided guidance and advice on careers, internships and fellowships to professionals and students in the communities they served.

The first diplomat in residence was Charles F. Baldwin, one time U.S. ambassador to Malaysia, at the University of Virginia in 1965. The term was created in the tradition of the University of Virginia's writer in residence and historian in residence.

The Diplomat in Residence program was eliminated in July 2025 as part of the Department of State's comprehensive reorganization.
