= 1954 Bitburg explosion =

Industrial disaster in Germany

Coordinates: 49.932°N 6.497°E

The devastating Bitburg tank explosion took place on 23 September 1954 at the then NATO air base near the city Bitburg, in the municipality of Niederstedem, Germany. The explosion took place in an underground storage tank containing JP-4, a military jet fuel blend. The toll was 34 dead, 2 injured, 3 missing. The explosion was caused by the deliberate activation of a novel carbon dioxide fire extinguishment system during an acceptance test as part of final commissioning. The JP-4 blend has since largely been abandoned due to safety concerns because of its low flash point.

== The accident ==
In 1954 at the US Air Force fuel depot near Bitburg, various acceptance tests were being made on a newly constructed underground fuel storage tank. The tank was fitted with a novel carbon dioxide fire extinguishing system, the first of its kind in Germany. The US Army was not responsible for design, construction and operation of storage facilities at the time, but the fuel involved was the property of the United States.

The senior engineering staff of the French La mission des grands travaux aéronautiques en Allemagne and other French and German officials, technicians and contractors were present at the site and attending an acceptance test.

The diameter of the underground tank was about 96 feet (29 m) with a total capacity of 1,386,000 US gal (5,250 m^{3}). The tank was about 20% full at the time of the accident. The roof of the underground tank was capped with iron reinforced concrete and covered with a layer of soil. The CO_{2} cylinders were located in a half-buried concrete structure about 250 feet (75 m) from the storage site. 120 gas cylinders, each with a liquid gas capacity of 30 kg, were connected together in a three battery arrangement. A buried steel pipeline connected the battery with the storage tank.

Most if not all of the victims were standing on the top of the tank during a controlled activation of the thermal sensing devices that would trigger CO_{2} cylinders to discharge gas into the tank's headspace. At about 16:00 hours, one minute after the CO_{2} discharge commenced, a massive explosion disintegrated the tank.

Although the ability of liquefied CO_{2} to create static electricity upon depressurization was reported as early as in 1925, it was unknown to the tank designers and not identified in the official investigation of the accident by the US Army. It was only identified later in a report by German scientists.

== Relevance ==
The accident has relevance today as it demonstrates the dangers of static electricity when injecting carbon dioxide into an ignitable atmosphere. As such, it is a case example of de-learning. Knowledge on hazards learned the hard way through accidents can be forgotten. This has happened in the fast-growing wood pellet industry where trouble with smoldering fires in storage silos has led to new techniques for firefighting which employ injection of inert gases such as carbon dioxide. Although the electrostatic hazard has been known for more than 50 years, many standards, guidelines, recent editions of frequently cited pellet handbooks, and other literature cover the hazard superficially or do not mention it at all. The hazard is insufficiently covered in NFPA 12 and it may constitute a hazard for seagoing general cargo vessels where fire protection for cargo holds employs pressurized storage of liquefied carbon dioxide.

== See also ==
- Inerting (gas)
