= Cookie pusher =

Slang term

The slang term cookie pusher has been applied to diplomats in general and members of the United States Foreign Service specifically.

== Origin ==
The Listserv of the American Dialect Society documents "cookie pusher" as being coined by US diplomat Hugh S. Gibson in 1924.

== Usage mid-century ==
The term has been used a number of times throughout the 20th and 21st centuries, sometimes in derogatory form but at other times in the spirit of a pseudonym for American Foreign Service Officers. A series of articles in The Christian Science Monitor that ran in February 1950 were subtitled "Alias Cookie Pushers". The articles were very laudatory towards the US Foreign Service, talking about the conditions encountered at the time, versus stereotypes of diplomats being "striped pants Cookie Pushers from Harvard."

== Modern usage ==
Ivor Evans in Brewer's Dictionary of Phrase and Fable uses the term denoting a junior diplomat who functions as a roving waiter at an official reception, presumably "pushing" appetizers on people who do not really want them.

== Usage in US Department of State speeches ==
- Former Secretary of State James F. Byrnes in his remarks to the House Appropriations Committee delivered on April 9, 1946, during hearings on the State Department's 1947 supply bill.

As to these 'striped-pants' fellows, I have to take off my hat to them. I have found that through the years they have been step-children in the (diplomatic) service, so far as compensation goes... I see in the service no inducement to a young fellow to leave home, enter the service, be sent all over the world... Perhaps he rarely gets a chance to see his family or friends. Because we never see him, we reward him by calling him a cookie pusher. And the fellow himself never has a chance to say anything."

- Former Ambassador R. Nicholas Burns:

...We are also the victims of an unfortunate caricature of our profession. That is, a lot of people think we are pin-striped cookie pushers. I know that because I am a regular guest, for better or worse, on the Ollie North Show. His listeners often tell me that I'm a pin-striped cookie pusher. So we have got to find a way to communicate to the public what it is we do and who we are and why we're worth supporting. ...

- State Principal Deputy Assistant Secretary Wendy Chamberlin:

...It is quite clear then that the challenge to those who are responsible for protecting our citizens is to become as global and coordinated in our response as the criminals are in their operations. We must respond internationally. And who then are among the players on this international field—the diplomats. What a frightening thought! The American press, not known for its gentle touch, refers to diplomats as cookie pushers, or more charitably, as the stripe pants set. My mission today is to make a plausible case that the newest gladiators in the international crime arena are the diplomats...

- Former Deputy Secretary of State Richard Armitage:

...Now, I realize that when most people in this country and around the world think of the State Department, they probably think of Secretary Powell, not the men and women standing behind him and beside him with wires coming out of their ears. Or they think of polite cookie-pushers in pinstripes, not the fraud investigators who kick down doors to arrest career criminals or the trainers who are teaching Colombians how to foil the epidemic of kidnappings in that country. And while I would be the first to say we are fortunate, indeed, that people associate US diplomacy with Secretary Powell, we all know the other stereotype, about cookie-pushers, just isn't true, in the sense that our colleagues, regardless of what "cone" or office they may be in are putting their lives on the line for the American people every day, just like all of you are. In this Department of State family, we have the privilege of working with some of the most talented and dedicated people in this nation and we are all in this together. The pinstriped stereotype is also untrue in another sense. The people who actually execute the diplomacy, the ones who negotiate treaties and write reporting cables, they are actually a very small part of our overall workforce. Approximately 11 percent, I believe. Moreover, they could not accomplish their duties without the other 89 percent. ... And you can see clear illustration of this in our top foreign policy priorities of the day: the war on terrorism in general and Afghanistan and Iraq in particular. ...

- Former US Secretary of State Colin Powell to the U.S. Global Leadership Campaign:

...I get annoyed when someone says, "Oh, they're pin-striped cookie pushers." You tell that to Ambassador Khalilzad in Kabul, who spent all of last week and all of last Saturday criss-crossing the country, personal risk to himself, in order to encourage the Afghan people to vote. You tell that to Ambassador Negroponte tonight in Baghdad, who is facing a challenging situation. You tell that to Ambassador Tom Miller in Athens, who has done such a marvelous job representing us in Greece and did a terrific job getting the Greek Government, helping them get ready for the Olympics. Those ambassadors and the members of their teams are doing a great job for the American people, day-in, day-out, under increasingly difficult circumstances and at risk to themselves and to their family. And we've got to make sure we continue to give them the support that they need. We've got to make sure that the American people appreciate what they are doing for them. We've got to make sure that they get the respect that they deserve.

- The American Foreign Service Association during possible forced assignment of officers to Iraq in 2007 (which was not finally necessary due to enough volunteers):

... a diplomatic draft is unnecessary and that "thousands" of diplomats have volunteered for Iraq over the past five years. We're not weenies, we're not cowards, we're not cookie pushers in Europe ... This has never been necessary in a generation.

== See also ==
- United States Foreign Service
- Diplomacy
