= Purging (gas) =

Use of an inert gas to prevent formation of ignitable atmosphere

In fire and explosion prevention engineering, purging refers to the introduction of an inert (i.e. non-combustible) purge gas into a closed system (e.g. a container or a process vessel) to prevent the formation of an ignitable atmosphere. Purging relies on the principle that a combustible (or flammable) gas is able to undergo combustion (explode) only if mixed with air in the right proportions. The flammability limits of the gas define those proportions, i.e. the ignitable range.

== Purge into service ==
Assume a closed system (e.g. a container or process vessel), initially containing air, which shall be prepared for safe introduction of a flammable gas, for instance as part of a start-up procedure. The system can be flushed with an inert gas to reduce the concentration of oxygen so that when the flammable gas is admitted, an ignitable mixture cannot form. In NFPA 56, this is known as purge-into-service. In combustion engineering terms, the admission of inert gas dilutes the oxygen below the limiting oxygen concentration.

== Purge out of service ==
Assume a closed system containing a flammable gas, which shall be prepared for safe ingress of air, for instance as part of a shut-down procedure. The system can be flushed with an inert gas to reduce the concentration of the flammable gas so that when air is introduced, an ignitable mixture cannot form. In NFPA 56 this is known as purge-out-of-service.

== Benefits of having two purging terms ==
It is useful with two terms for purging because purge-out-of-service requires much larger quantities of inert agent than purge-into-service. The terminology of German standards refers to purge-into-service as partial inerting, and purge-out-of-service as total inerting, clearly indicating the difference between the two purging practices, although the choice of the term inerting, rather than purging, can be confusing, see below.

== Comparison with other explosion prevention practices ==
Prevention of accidental fires and explosions can also be achieved by controlling sources of ignition. Purging with an inert gas provides a higher degree of safety however, because the practice ensures that an ignitable mixture never forms. Purging can therefore be said to rely on primary prevention, reducing the possibility of an explosion, whereas control of sources of ignition relies on secondary prevention, reducing the probability of an explosion. Primary prevention is also known as inherent safety.

== Confusion with inerting ==
The purge gas is inert, i.e. by definition non-combustible, or more precisely, non-reactive. The most common purge gases commercially available in large quantities are nitrogen and carbon dioxide. Other inert gases, e.g. argon or helium may be used. Nitrogen and carbon dioxide are unsuitable purge gases in some applications, as these gases may undergo chemical reaction with fine dusts of certain light metals.

Because an inert purge gas is used, the purge procedure may (erroneously) be referred to as inerting in everyday language. This confusion may lead to dangerous situations. Carbon dioxide is a safe inert gas for purging. Carbon dioxide is an unsafe inert gas for inerting, as it may ignite the vapors and result in an explosion.

== See also ==
- ATEX
- Flammability limits
- Limiting oxygen concentration
- Inerting (gas)
