= MGTA =

MGTA may refer to:

- La mission des grands travaux aéronautiques en Allemagne, French government unit (1951–1991)
- MgtA, a Magnesium transporter protein
- MG TA, a car
