= Foreign Service officer =

Member of the United States Foreign Service

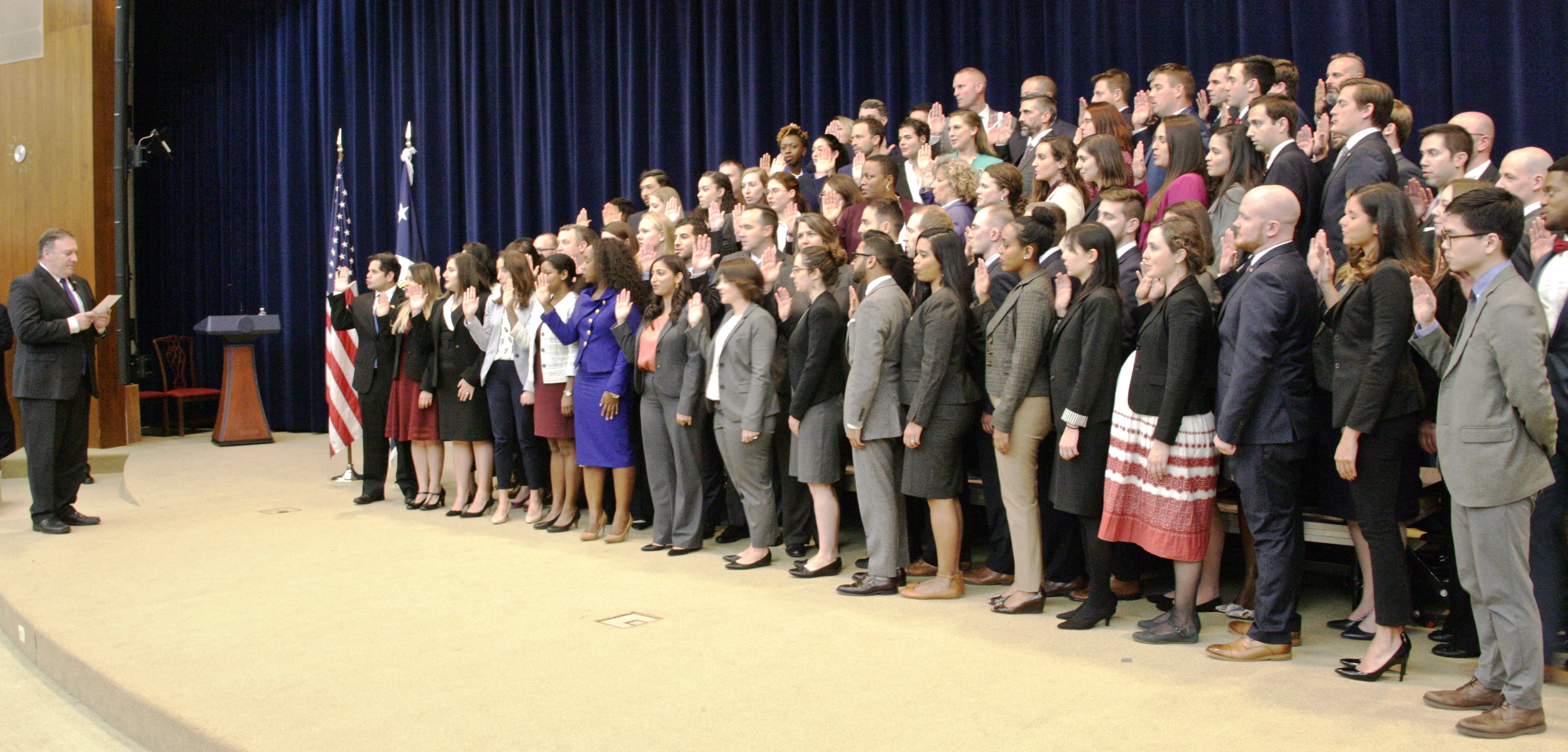
Secretary of State Mike Pompeo swears in the 194th Foreign Service Generalist Class in October 2018

A Foreign Service officer (FSO) is a commissioned member of the United States Foreign Service. FSOs formulate and implement the foreign policy of the United States. They spend most of their careers overseas as members of U.S. embassies, consulates, and other diplomatic missions, though some receive assignments to serve at combatant commands, Congress, and educational institutions such as the various U.S. service academies.

As of 2021, there were over 8,000 FSOs.

== Career tracks ==
FSOs of the State Department are split among five career tracks, called "cones": consular officers, economic officers, management officers, political officers, and public diplomacy officers.

- Consular officers are charged primarily with working with American citizens overseas on such activities as adoptions and issues in the country where stationed. In case of a disaster, these officers would be charged with evacuating Americans from the country.
- Economic officers work with foreign economic agencies to facilitate economic issues as well as foreign policy dealing with technology and sciences.
- Management officers are responsible for the internal affairs of an embassy or consulate; they deal with the personnel and budgets of the embassy, contracts and services. They negotiate administrative issues with the host nation.
- Political officers interact with foreign governments on policy issues and negotiating policy.
- Public Diplomacy officers inform the citizens of their respective countries on the actions of the embassy, including meeting with the press and giving educational events.

FSOs of the U.S. Agency for International Development (USAID), Commercial Service, Foreign Agricultural Service, and Agency for Global Media are selected through processes specific to the hiring agency. They follow career tracks separate from those of State Department FSOs. For example, within USAID, there are multiple technical "backstops," including:

- Agriculture
- Contracting
- Crisis stabilization and governance
- Economic growth
- Education
- Engineering
- Environment
- Executive
- Financial management
- Legal
- Population, health and nutrition
- Private enterprise
- Program/project development

Many leadership roles at U.S. embassies are typically filled from the ranks of career FSOs, who receive extensive training for these roles, including learning languages and cultures of numerous countries. In the early twenty-first century, about two-thirds of U.S. ambassadors have been career Foreign Service members primarily drawn from the Department of State. Ambassadors have been selected from other foreign affairs agencies from time to time.

Almost all of the remaining third are political appointees, considered patronage appointments by changing administrations. A handful of State Department Senior Executive Service personnel have received ambassadorships. FSOs also help fill critical management and foreign policy positions at the headquarters of foreign affairs agencies in Washington, D.C.

== Hiring process ==
Applicants for State Department FSO jobs go through a highly competitive written exam, oral assessment, and security investigation process before they are eligible to be hired. Of the more than 100,000 applicants for State Department FSO positions between 2001 and 2006, only 2,100 became Foreign Service officers. Once candidates have completed the application process, received a top secret security clearance, been medically cleared for worldwide deployment, and passed a final suitability review, they receive a score and are placed on a hiring register for their career tracks.

New candidates are appointed from the top of the register (highest score), and candidates who are not appointed within 18 months will be removed from the register. Candidates may decline one offer; declining a second will strike their names from the register. Some candidates go on "do-not-call" status until they are ready to receive offers, but the 18-month timer still continues to run. It is common for a candidate with a low score to simply expire from the register, thus making the process even more competitive. In the end, fewer than 2% of initial applicants to the State Department Foreign Service will matriculate as Foreign Service officers.

In extremely rare cases when no Foreign Service officers are available, non-career civil servants can be appointed by the secretary for entry into the Foreign Service, providing they meet rigorous standards expected of career members. These limited appointees are not officially members of Foreign Service and must leave any time a career officer becomes available for their positions. This is a legal requirement negotiated with the American Foreign Service Association.

Prior to the agency's dissolution, applicants for the U.S. Agency for International Development (USAID) FSO jobs followed a somewhat different process. Most positions required an advanced degree (often a master's) and pertinent job experience related to their portfolios. Candidates would undergo an interview and testing process tailored to that portfolio that was more similar to most civil service hiring processes.

== See also ==
- United States Foreign Service
- Indian Foreign Service
- His Majesty's Diplomatic Service
- United States Department of State
- Foreign Service specialist
- American Foreign Service Association
- Foreign Agricultural Service
- United States Agency for International Development
- United States Commercial Service
- Cookie pusher
- Clientitis
- Lucile Atcherson Curtis, the first woman in what became the U.S. Foreign Service
