= Loss of MV Alva Cape =

1966 maritime incident

Coordinates: 39.009°N 71.409°W

In June 1966, the British oil tanker MV Alva Cape caught fire twice in New York Harbor, first in a collision with tanker SS Texaco Massachusetts, and next while unloading cargo, and was subsequently scuttled offshore. Thirty-three people were killed in the collision, the resulting spill of its cargo of naphtha and major fire that ensued. Four more were killed about two weeks later while the emptied tanks were being inerted with carbon dioxide in a misguided attempt to make the damaged vessel safe for transport.

== Ships ==
Alva Cape was built at the Greenock Dockyard Company. She was launched on May 15, 1953, and was delivered in September of the same year. She was 166 metres (545 ft) long, with a beam of 21 metres (69 ft), and a draft of 9 metres (30 ft), and measured 11,252 GRT and 16,590 DWT. Her propulsion was a single diesel engine that gave her a service speed of 14 knots (16 mph). At the time of her loss, she was owned by the Alva Steamship Company and under charter to Esso.

During 1957 Alva Cape was under the command of Captain Paddy Dove. On May 25, 1957, Capt. Dove took ill and died onboard the Alva Cape whilst she was plying off the coast of Indonesia.

Texaco Massachusetts was built at the Bethlehem Sparrows Point Shipyard. She was launched on September 20, 1962, and was delivered in January 1963. She was 184 metres (604 ft) long, with a beam of 24 metres (79 ft), and measured 16,516 GRT and 25,728 DWT. She was powered by a single steam turbine that gave her a service speed of 17.5 knots (20.1 mph). At the time of the collision, she was owned by Domestic Tankers. After the 1966 incident, she returned to service and operated until September 1995, when she was scrapped at Alang, India.

== First fire ==
On June 16 at about 14:30 local time, Alva Cape was moving westward through Kill Van Kull with a cargo of 4,200,000 US gallons (16,000,000 L) of naphtha, inbound from India. Texaco Massachusetts was outbound in ballast, bound for Port Arthur, Texas, and was turning into the channel from Newark Bay when she collided with Alva Cape on the latter ship's starboard side at the west end of Kill Van Kull, just west of the Bayonne Bridge. At the time of the collision, Texaco Massachusetts was being aided by the tugboat Latin American, while Alva Cape had the tug Esso Vermont alongside.

Immediately after the collision, Texaco Massachusetts began to back away, allowing naphtha to spill from Alva Cape and ignite, likely from the engine of Esso Vermont. A crew member from Texaco Massachusetts later testified that the master of his ship, Captain Richard Pinder, had ordered fire hoses deployed to spray foam, but only one had worked. The following fire burned until about 22:35, when firefighters from fireboats and the Staten Island fire department extinguished it. In addition to fireboats, small craft from the police department and Coast Guard were dispatched to the scene, along with seven tugboats.

Estimates of the number people aboard the four ships involved in the collision varied, ranging from 96 to 104. At least 60 people were hospitalized, about 40 of whom were released within two days. By the day after the fire, 21 people had been confirmed dead, including eight of the nine crew of Esso Vermont, with eleven missing. After continued searching failed to locate the missing, they were declared lost and the death toll was officially raised to 32 on June 19. Another person later died, bringing the final toll to 33.

Following the fire, Texaco Massachusetts sailed for Todd Shipyards in Brooklyn, while Alva Cape was grounded off of Bergen Point, New Jersey where preparations to unload the rest of her cargo were begun. She was later moved to anchor off Gravesend, Brooklyn for removal of the naphtha by salvers Merritt-Chapman & Scott. Esso Vermont was towed to Shooters Island, and Latin American was towed to a Staten Island shipyard. Both tankers were insured at Lloyd's of London, which said that the value of the policy on Texaco Massachusetts was $7 million and that of Alva Cape was $1.4 million.

=== Aftermath ===
==== Investigation ====
On June 17, the Coast Guard opened its investigation into the collision, with the first public meeting occurring on the 20th. It took place at the Alexander Hamilton U.S. Custom House, and was led by Rear Admiral William Ellis, with Captain Wilbur Doe and Commander Forrest Stewart, all of the Guard's Eastern Area, filling the other spots on the board of inquiry.

On July 18, the pilot of Alva Cape at the time of the collision, Donald Baker, was charged by the Coast Guard with negligence; Baker disputed the charge, having testified that Texaco Massachusetts had caused the collision when she changed course unexpectedly. Previous testimony by Texaco Massachusetts crewmembers indicated that the tanker had been in the process of turning when she collided with Alva Cape, although accounts differed as to whether she had been turning to port or starboard. Baker was charged with four counts of negligence—that he had not used caution in navigation, that he had not yielded to another ship, that he had not reduced speed when approaching another ship, and that he had not sounded a danger signal. His hearing was adjourned until September to allow time to prepare a defense. On September 12, eight further charges of negligence relating to Baker's actions after the collision were brought, and his hearing was therefore delayed again until the end of September.

On August 3, pilot Patrick Kelly, who was in command of Texaco Massachusetts, was charged with four counts of negligence—failure to use caution in navigating, failure as a "privileged vessel" to maintain course and speed, failure to sound a danger signal, and failure to sound a signal indicating his ship was reversing. His hearing was likewise delayed until September. On September 13, Kelly, by then charged with eight counts of negligence, entered a denial of all charges.

During the course of the Coast Guard's investigation, the National Transportation Safety Board (NTSB) was founded on April 1, 1967, and given responsibility for finding the cause of and reporting on transportation accidents, and the final report was therefore issued by the NTSB on October 16, 1967. It found that both pilots Baker and Kelly had failed to use the required caution when in command of their vessels, though Alva Cape was primarily at fault as she had been required to yield to Texaco Massachusetts under the rules of the sea.

==== Legal action ====
On June 22, three companies filed competing suits in district court. Alva Steamship Company filed a petition for exoneration of liability, saying that Alva Cape had been seaworthy and appropriately crewed and that Texaco Massachusetts and her accompanying tugboat had been responsible for the collision. Domestic Tankers filed a $300,000 suit against Humble Oil, owner of Esso Vermont and Alva Cape's cargo. Humble Oil filed a competing $750,000 suit against Domestic, alleging that Texaco Massachusetts and Latin American were at fault as a result of failures of navigation.

On June 24, Alva Steamship Company filed a new $2 million suit against Texaco Massachusetts, Domestic Tankers, and operator Texaco, claiming that Texaco Massachusetts and her crew were at fault. This was followed on the 27th by an $8 million injury suit filed on behalf of 32 Texaco Massachusetts crewmembers, each seeking $250,000, against Domestic Tankers, Texaco, Alva Steamship Company, Alva's manager Navigation and Coal Trade Company, and Humble Oil.

== Second fire ==
On June 28, Alva Cape caught fire at anchor in Gravesend Bay while the last of the naphtha still on board was being removed. A series of explosions at 15:49 triggered the fire, which was controlled in about an hour, though fireboats remained on the scene to spray foam into the ship until late in the evening.

Four people were killed in the explosions and fire, and nine were injured. The fire was responded to by police and fire boats, tugs, and helicopters. After the fire was extinguished, the Coast Guard ordered Alva Cape's hold flooded with inert gas or salt water to prevent further fire, and Mayor John Lindsay ordered the wrecked ship to be removed from the harbor.

On the afternoon of June 29, the Coast Guard ordered Alva Cape to be out of the harbor within 24 hours, later extended to 48 hours when Alva Steamship Company and its agent, Navcot, were unable to obtain towing.

=== Cause ===
New York City Fire Department Chief John O'Hagan said that the explosions had been triggered by heat and the mixing of naphtha with oxygen. During the investigation into the fire, Captain Frederick Zickl, who had been working on the unloading of the ship, said that the Fire Department had needlessly interfered in the process and criticized the decision to pump carbon dioxide into the ship; it was considered a possibility that the addition of carbon dioxide caused explosive gases to rise in the hold until they contacted hot steel plating. O'Hagan said that the fire department had only specified that an inert gas be used, and said that the salvage operation had been proceeding too slowly and had allowed naphtha to spill into the water.

The investigation into the fire was led by Coast Guard Lieutenant Commander Robert Burke, who issued his report on March 8, 1967 and found that the unloading operation had not had the supervision required to safely carry it out. Burke specifically cited the lack of a marine chemist on the scene, as required by the Fire Department, and an expert in inerting procedures, as recommended by the National Fire Protection Association.

Later investigations state that when the main fire had been extinguished, the naphtha that was left in the vessel's tanks was transferred into a barge. There was a concern if the flammable vapors that remained in the vessel's now empty tanks would constitute an unacceptable hazard during the tow. For reasons that are not completely clear, it was decided to inert the tanks with carbon dioxide and ten 25 kg (50 lbs) cylinders of carbon dioxide were brought to the site. One of the cylinders were connected to a plastic hose 7 m (21 ft) long. Half a cylinder was discharged into one tank without incident. When the rest of the cylinder was discharged into another tank an explosion took place. The discharge of carbon dioxide generated static electricity which ignited the flammable vapors.

== Scuttling ==
After some delay, owing to the requirement that the Coast Guard obtain written permission from the owners and insurers of Alva Cape before sinking her, the process of towing her out of the harbor began at dawn on July 2, when lines were attached fore and aft to tugboats Kerry Moran and Nancy Moran. At about 09:00, Alva Cape, the two tugs, and escorting Coast Guard cutters USCGC Spencer and USCGC Yeaton got underway to a point about 150 miles (240 km) southeast of New York. She was towed backwards, due to the weakness of her bow, at a speed of about 4 knots (4.6 mph).

The ships arrived at the site on the morning of July 3 after a 24-hour voyage, whereupon the tugs released their lines and Spencer opened fire on Alva Cape with antiaircraft shells at 09:36. Spencer fired her full complement of 57 shells, 37 of which hit the tanker, and ceased fire at 11:59. Alva Cape, with more than 1,000,000 US gallons (3,800,000 L) of naphtha still aboard, burned for about an hour more until her hull split and she sank at 13:06.
