= United States National Mine Health and Safety Academy =

United States federal academy

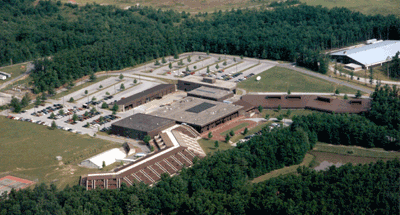
The National Mine Health and Safety Academy

The United States National Mine Health and Safety Academy is a federal academy responsible for training the mine safety and health inspectors and technical support personnel of the Mine Safety and Health Administration.

The Academy is located in Beckley, West Virginia, on an 80-acre (320,000 m^{2}) site near the Raleigh County Airport. The Academy complex consists of nine buildings: The Residence Hall, Administration Building, Classroom Building, Mine Machinery Laboratory Building, Publication Distribution Center, Gymnasium, Maintenance and Equipment Building, Mine Emergency Operations Building, Mine Rescue Station and Mine Simulation Laboratory.

Students are exposed to a variety of different disciplines in nine different laboratories: roof control, ground control, mine emergencies and rescue, ventilation, electrical systems, machinery, industrial hygiene, computer systems and underground mine simulation.

== History ==
In a five-year period from 1906-1911, 13,228 miners were killed in U.S. coal mines. As a result, the Bureau of Mines was established by Congress on July 1, 1910, "to make diligent investigation of the methods of mining, especially in relation to the safety of miners and the appliances best adapted to prevent accidents."

In succeeding years, Congress passed other legislation designed to promote health and safety in the mines, including the 1966 Federal Metal and Nonmetallic Mine Safety Act (P.L. 89-577) and the Federal Coal Mine Health and Safety Act of 1969 (P.L. 91-173). The most recent regulatory legislation combined the coal and metal and nonmetal industries under one law--the Federal Mine Safety and Health Act of 1977. This act directed that "The National Mine Health and Safety Academy shall be...responsible for the training of mine safety and health inspectors, mining personnel, or other persons as the Secretaries of Labor and Interior shall designate. In performing this function, the Academy shall have the authority to enter into cooperative educational and training agreements with educational institutions, State governments, labor organizations, and mine operators and related industries." It is through the training provisions of this legislation that the National Mine Health and Safety Academy functions.

In response to the mandates of the Coal Mine Health and Safety Act of 1969, on September 7, 1971, the Academy began inspector training in temporary facilities in Beckley, West Virginia. On August 17, 1976, the permanent facility, situated on 80 acres (320,000 m^{2}) of land donated by the Raleigh County Airport Authority, opened its doors with an official dedication. Michael George Zabetakis was the first superintendent of the Academy.

On July 25, 1979, Public Law 96-38 transferred the activities and functions of the National Mine Health and Safety Academy from the Department of the Interior to the Department of Labor.
