= American Foreign Service Association =

Professional association

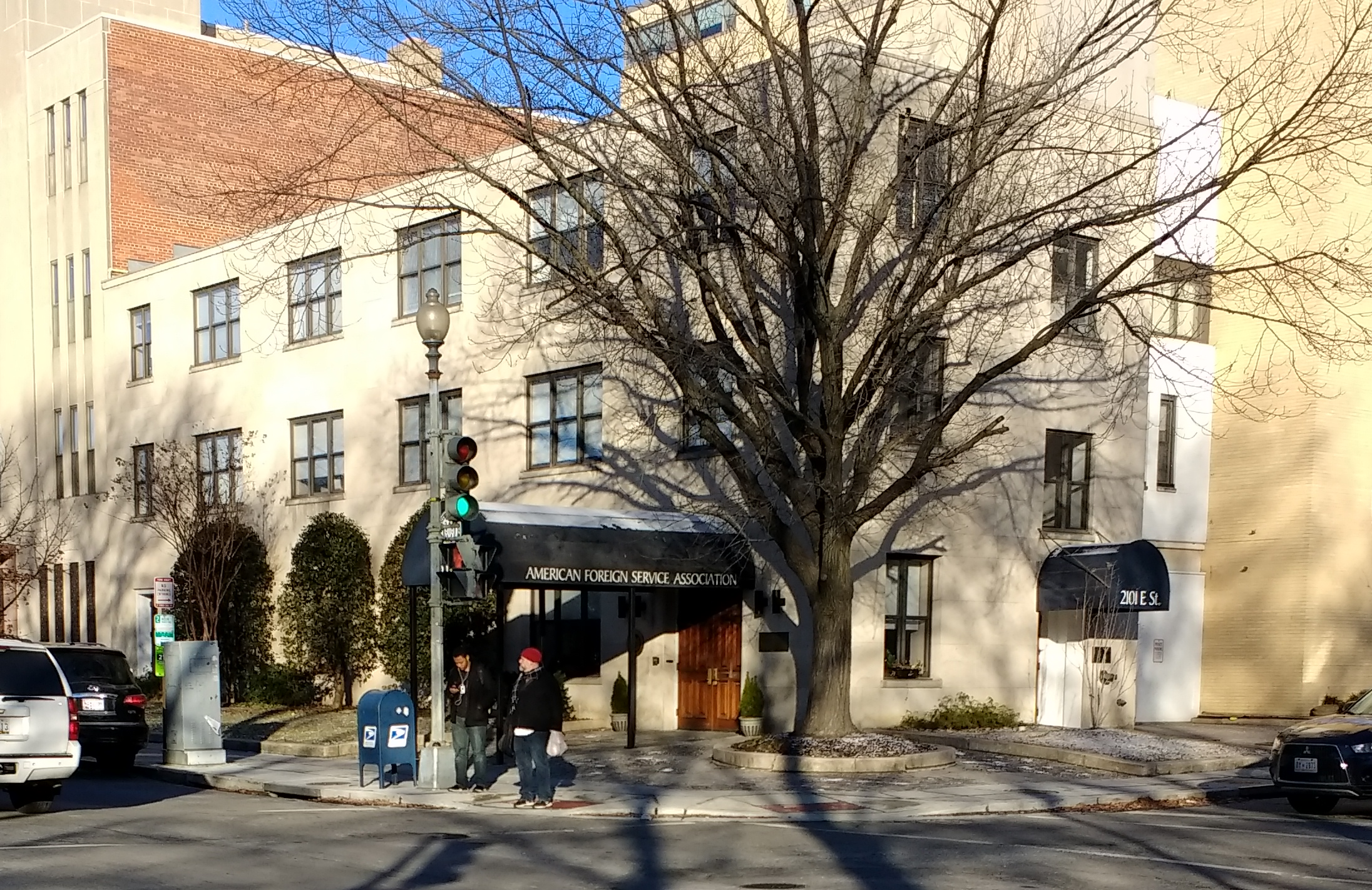
- Abbreviation: AFSA
- Founded: 1924
- Tax ID no.: 53-0173091
- Legal status: 501(c)(5) professional association
- Headquarters: Washington, D.C., United States
- Coordinates: 38.896194°N 77.046940°W
- President: John W. Dinkelman
- Affiliations: American Foreign Service Association Scholarship Fund, Fund for American Diplomacy, American Foresign Service Association PAC
- Revenue: $4,375,615 (2014)
- Expenses: $4,467,879 (2014)
- Employees: 40 (2014)
- Volunteers: 40 (2014)
- Website: afsa.org

The American Foreign Service Association (AFSA), established in 1924, is the professional association of the United States Foreign Service. With over 15,000 due-paying members, AFSA represents 28,000 active and retired Foreign Service employees of the Department of State and Agency for International Development (AID), as well as smaller groups in the Foreign Agricultural Service (FAS), Foreign Commercial Service (FCS), and International Broadcasting Bureau (IBB).

== History ==
American Foreign Service Association's principal missions are to enhance the effectiveness of the Foreign Service, to protect the professional interests of its members, to ensure the maintenance of high professional standards for both career diplomats and political appointees, and to promote understanding of the critical role of the Foreign Service in promoting America's national security and economic prosperity.

American Foreign Service Association is the exclusive bargaining agent for the Foreign Service employees of all five agencies. In this labor/management relations capacity, American Foreign Service Association negotiates with the agency management on personnel policies and practices affecting members' working conditions. American Foreign Service Association also represents members in formal grievance proceedings, office of security and inspector general investigations, and EEO cases, while providing them informal assistance in dealing with administrative problems.

Foreign Service retiree concerns are an integral part of the American Foreign Service Association agenda. American Foreign Service Association works closely with retired Foreign Service personnel on legislative issues related to retiree pensions and benefits. Retirees, individually and through independent retiree groups around the country, actively promote the Foreign Service and international engagement in their communities.

In its efforts to explain the Foreign Service's role and to build domestic constituencies to support its activities, American Foreign Service Association operates a speakers' bureau, which makes experienced diplomats available to speak to a wide range of groups all across the country. Through Road Scholar programs, American Foreign Service Association members conduct continuing education classes on the Foreign Service.

== Governance ==
AFSA's Governing Board is elected by the membership every two years. The board's constitution is governed by the American Foreign Service Association's bylaws. The board has 21 members for the 2019-2021 term.

== Offices ==
AFSA maintains its headquarters building at 2101 E Street NW in Washington, DC. There are also smaller offices within the Department of State, USAID, and the Department of Commerce.

== Awards ==
Since 1968, American Foreign Service Association has honored achievement, performance, courage and sacrifice within the Foreign Service community through their awards program. All of American Foreign Service Association's awards programs, as well the American Foreign Service Association's memorial plaques, are administered by American Foreign Service Association's Coordinator for Special Awards and Outreach.

=== Constructive Dissent Awards ===
American Foreign Service Association's Constructive Dissent Awards recognize Foreign Service members who work constructively within the system to change policy and performance for the better. Such dissents may be made in any non-public channel including meetings, emails to superiors, memoranda, telegrams, or via the State Department's formal Dissent Channel. Thus, American Foreign Service Association's Constructive Dissent Awards may be given to, but are not restricted to, employees who send in Dissent Channel messages. These awards are unique within the federal government, and remain the center of American Foreign Service Association's awards program. There are four awards:

- F. Allen 'Tex' Harris Award for Foreign Service specialists
- W. Averell Harriman Award for entry-level officers
- William R. Rivkin Award for mid-level officers
- Christian A. Herter Award for members of the Senior Foreign Service

=== Exemplary Performance Awards ===
Six Exemplary Performance Awards are given each year to highlight the professionalism and spirit of service and volunteerism found within the Foreign Service community. These awards honor community liaison officers, office management specialists, family members, and American Foreign Service Association post representatives for their important contributions at work, at home and in the community at large. In addition, these awards honor contributions to American Foreign Service Association and those who have excelled in the advancement of democracy.

- Nelson B. Delavan Award
- Avis Bohlen Award
- M. Juanita Guess Award
- AFSA Achievement and Contributions to the Association Award
- Post Representative of the Year Award
- Mark Palmer Award for the Advancement of Democracy

=== Lifetime Contributions to American Diplomacy ===
The American Foreign Service Association established its award for Lifetime Contributions to American Diplomacy in 1995. By giving this high-profile award, American Foreign Service Association also seeks to bring greater recognition to its other awards, including its unique annual awards for constructive dissent Candidates are proposed by American Foreign Service Association's Awards and Plaque Committee. The American Foreign Service Association governing board makes the final decision.

Originally, there were no criteria beyond those implied by the award's name. In 2009, the American Foreign Service Association's Governing Board specified that "lifetime" means at least a decade of service to diplomacy, ideally including continuing involvement after retirement. The contributions should include involvement in foreign policy development and/or implementation as well as efforts that advance the diplomatic profession. Recipients will normally be career diplomats, but may include other individuals in exceptional cases. Recipients must attend American Foreign Service Association's annual awards ceremony.

The presentation takes place during American Foreign Service Association's annual Awards Ceremony in June in the Benjamin Franklin Diplomatic Room of the State Department. The Secretary of State is invited to present this award. If the Secretary is unable to attend, a distinguished individual who has worked with the recipient is asked to present the award. Colin Powell presented the award to Thomas Pickering and to George Shultz; Elliot Richardson presented the award to Frank Carlucci; Mr. Carlucci presented it to Lee Hamilton; Robert Zoellick presented it to Richard Lugar; Senator Lugar presented to award to Senator Nunn; and Lawrence Eagleburger presented the award to Joan Clark. Honorees are presented with a globe and certificate.

The Lifetime Contributions to American Diplomacy is American Foreign Service Association's highest award. It is offered to an inspiring and respected diplomat or public servant for their contributions to the conduct and success of American diplomacy. The criteria call for a sustained commitment to the cause for a good portion of their professional lives.

Previous Recipients of the Lifetime Contributions to American Diplomacy Award:

Year Given	Recipient(s)
2015	William Harrop
2014	Charles Stuart 'Stu' Kennedy, Jr.
2013	George W. Landau
2012	William Lacy Swing
2011	Rozanne L. 'Roz' Ridgway
2010	L. Bruce Laingen
2009	Sen. Sam Nunn
2008	Thomas D. Boyatt
2007	Joan Clark
2006	Morton Abramowitz
2005	Sen. Richard Lugar
2004	Richard B. Parker
2003	George Shultz
2002	Thomas Pickering
2001	Rep. Lee Hamilton
2000	David Newsom
1999	Cyrus Vance
1998	Lawrence Eagleburger
1997	George H.W. Bush
1996	Frank Carlucci
1995	U. Alexis Johnson

=== Sinclaire Language Awards ===
These awards celebrate those Foreign Service employees who have demonstrated the greatest facility and success in the learning and utilization of languages in their career. This learning may have taken place at FSI or individually. The awards are made possible through a generous bequest from former Foreign Service Officer Mathilda W. Sinclaire.

=== George F. Kennan Strategic Writing Award ===
Each year, American Foreign Service Association honors the State Department employee whose essay has been chosen as the best from among their cohort during the National War College graduation ceremonies. The award is named after George Kennan.

=== AFSA Memorial Plaques ===
Two large memorial plaques in the C Street lobby of the Department of State honor colleagues who have given their lives in service to their country. Each year, names are added and those on the plaques are honored during a solemn ceremony on Foreign Affairs Day.

=== AFSA National High School Essay Contest ===
The National High School Essay Contest is available to all High School students in each of the 50 states, the District of Columbia, U.S. territories, and to U.S. citizens pursuing high school education abroad. The competition awards a $2,500 cash prize, a paid trip to Washington, D.C., to meet the Secretary of State and a tuition-free Semester at Sea upon enrollment at an accredited post-secondary institution.

== Selected publications ==
- American Foreign Service Association; Dorman, Shawn (2003). Inside a U.S. embassy: how the foreign service works for America (2nd ed.). Washington, DC: American Foreign Service Association. ISBN 0964948826.

== See also ==
- United States Department of State
- United States Foreign Service
- Professional Association of Foreign Service Officers, Canada
