= Michael George Zabetakis =

Fire safety engineering specialist

- Born: 3 March 1924; Burgettstown, PA
- Died: 21 January 2005 (aged 80); Bridgeville, PA
- Education: Washington & Jefferson College; University of Pittsburgh
- Known for: Fire safety engineering Mine Safety and Health Administration

Michael George Zabetakis (7 July 1924 – 21 January 2005) was a fire safety engineering specialist. He received his PhD in chemistry from the University of Pittsburgh in 1956. In 1965 he published data for flammability limits, autoignition, and burning-rate data for more than 200 combustible gases and vapors in air and other oxidants, as well as of empirical rules and graphs that can be used to predict similar data for thousands of other combustibles under a variety of environmental conditions. The work remains one of the most widely cited sources of flammability data. Despite its age it was still in 1999 considered the standard reference. Zabetakis often uses flammability diagrams to show flammable properties of fuel-air-nitrogen mixtures. Zabetakis was the first superintendent of the National Mine Health and Safety Academy.
