= Flammability diagram =

Plot of flammability in gaseous mixtures

Flammability diagram for methane

Flammability diagrams show the control of flammability in mixtures of fuel, oxygen and an inert gas, typically nitrogen. Mixtures of the three gasses are usually depicted in a triangular diagram, known as a ternary plot. Such diagrams are available in literature. The same information can be depicted in a normal orthogonal diagram, showing only two substances, implicitly using the feature that the sum of all three components is 100 percent. The diagrams below only concerns one fuel; the diagrams can be generalized to mixtures of fuels.

== Understanding flammability diagrams ==
Triangular diagrams are not commonplace. The easiest way to understand them is to briefly go through three basic steps in their construction.

1. Consider the first triangular diagram below, which shows all possible mixtures of methane, oxygen and nitrogen. Air is a mixture of about 21 volume percent oxygen, and 79 volume percent inerts (nitrogen). Any mixture of methane and air will therefore lie on the straight line between pure methane and pure air – this is shown as the blue air-line. The upper and lower flammability limits of methane in air are located on this line, as shown (labelled UEL and LEL, respectively).
2. The stoichiometric combustion of methane is: CH_{4} + 2O_{2} → CO_{2} + 2H_{2}O. The stoichiometric concentration of methane in oxygen is therefore 1/(1+2), which is 33 percent. Any stoichiometric mixture of methane and oxygen will lie on the straight line between pure nitrogen (and zero percent methane) and 33 percent methane (and 67 percent oxygen) – this is shown as the red stoichiometric line. The upper and lower flammability limits of methane in oxygen are located on the methane axis, as shown.
3. The actual envelope defining the flammability zone can only be determined based on experiments. The envelope will pass through the upper and lower flammability limits of methane in oxygen and in air, as shown. The nose of the envelope defines the limiting oxygen concentration (LOC)). An example of such an experimental investigation of the flammability zone and the corresponding laminar flame speed can be found in reference for mixtures of methane, oxygen and nitrogen at sub-atmospheric pressures.
Triangular diagram showing all possible mixtures of methane, oxygen and nitrogen. Any mixture of methane and air will lie on the blue air-line

Any stoichiometric mixture of methane and oxygen will lie on the red stoichiometric line

The actual flammability envelope defining flammable mixtures of methane

== See also ==
- Ternary plot
- Flammability limit

== Sources ==
- Bee, A.; Börner, M. (2023). "Laminar Burning Speeds and Flammability Limits of CH4/O2 Mixtures With Varying N2 Dilution at Sub-Atmospheric Conditions" (PDF). Combustion Science and Technology. 195 (8). Taylor & Francis: 1910–1929. doi:10.1080/00102202.2021.2006191.
- Zabetakis, Michael G. (1965). Flammability characteristics of combustible gases and vapors (Buletin 627). US Bureau of Mines, Wash., D.C. p. 129. Archived from the original on May 15, 2012. (His main work, 6.3Mb download)
- Burgess, DS; Furno AL; Kuchta JM; Mura KE (1982). "Flammability of mixed gases". Report of Investigations. RI-8709.
- Mashuga, CV; Crowl DA (1998). "Application of the flammability diagram for evaluation of fire and explosion hazards of flammable vapors". Process Safety Progress. 17 (3): 176–183. doi:10.1002/prs.680170305. S2CID 111043890.
- Crowl, Daniel A. (2003). Understanding Explosions. Wiley-AIChE. ISBN 0-8169-0779-X.
