= Regional English Language Officer =

Position in the US State Department

The Regional English Language Officer (RELO) is a position with the United States Department of State. The position serves under the Bureau of Educational and Cultural Affairs (ECA). RELOs are located throughout the world as career foreign service officers and participate in what can be considered soft power diplomacy by the United States.

== Background ==
There are currently 25 RELOs located around the world. Each officer has a budget of several million dollars used to enact programs that further the English language globally. These programs include, but are not limited to, distribution of the American literature, providing support to English teachers around the world, English teacher training, material support to public and private institutions that teach English, teacher exchanges, student exchanges, English language summer camps abroad, and more. The program was started in the 1950s.
