= Inert gas =

Gas which does not chemically react under the specified conditions

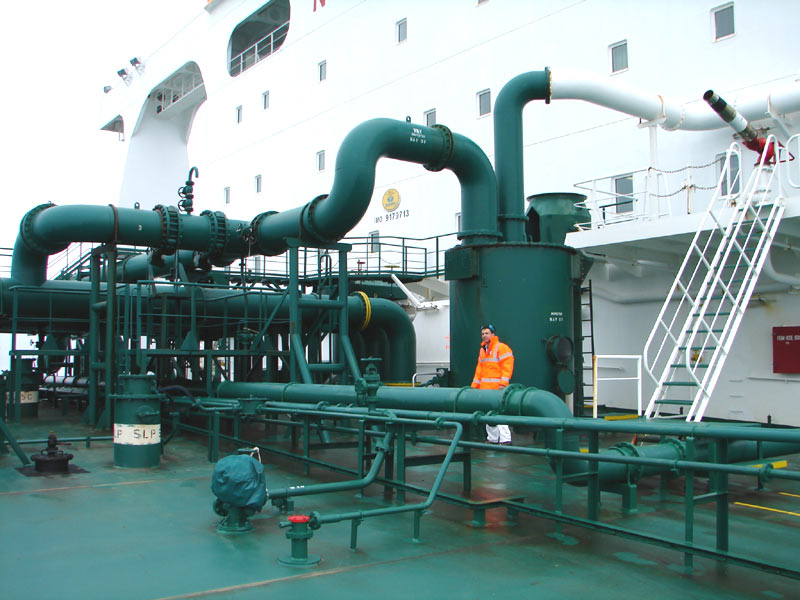
Inert gas pipe on an oil tanker

An inert gas is a gas that does not readily undergo chemical reactions with other chemical substances and therefore does not readily form chemical compounds. Though inert gases have a variety of applications, they are generally used to prevent unwanted chemical reactions with the oxygen (oxidation) and moisture (hydrolysis) in the air from degrading a sample. Generally, nitrogen, carbon dioxide, and all noble gases except oganesson (helium, neon, argon, krypton, xenon, and radon) are considered inert gases. The term inert gas is context-dependent because several of the inert gases, including nitrogen and carbon dioxide, can be made to react under certain conditions.

Purified argon gas is the most commonly used inert gas due to its high natural abundance (78.3% N_{2}, 1% Ar in air) and low relative cost.

Unlike noble gases, an inert gas is not necessarily elemental and is often a compound gas. Like the noble gases, the tendency for non-reactivity is due to the valence, the outermost electron shell, being complete in all the inert gases. This is a tendency, not a rule, as all noble gases and other "inert" gases can react to form compounds under some conditions.

== Need and necessity ==
The inert gases are obtained by fractional distillation of air, with the exception of helium which is separated from a few natural gas sources rich in this element, through cryogenic distillation or membrane separation. For specialized applications, purified inert gas shall be produced by specialized generators on-site. They are often used by chemical tankers and product carriers (smaller vessels). Benchtop specialized generators are also available for laboratories.

== Applications of inert gas ==
Because of the non-reactive properties of inert gases, they are often useful to prevent undesirable chemical reactions from taking place. Food is packed in an inert gas to remove oxygen gas. This prevents bacteria from growing. It also prevents chemical oxidation by oxygen in normal air. An example is the rancidification (caused by oxidation) of edible oils. In food packaging, inert gases are used as a passive preservative, in contrast to active preservatives like sodium benzoate (an antimicrobial) or BHT (an antioxidant).

Historical documents may also be stored under inert gas to avoid degradation. For example, the original documents of the U.S. Constitution are stored under humidified argon. Helium was previously used, but it was less suitable because it diffuses out of the case more quickly than argon.

Inert gases are often used in the chemical industry. In a chemical manufacturing plant, reactions can be conducted under inert gas to minimize fire hazards or unwanted reactions. In such plants and in oil refineries, transfer lines and vessels can be purged with inert gas as a fire and explosion prevention measure. At the bench scale, chemists perform experiments on air-sensitive compounds using air-free techniques developed to handle them under inert gas. Helium, neon, argon, krypton, xenon, and radon are inert gases.

=== Inert gas systems on ships ===
Inert gas is produced on board crude oil carriers (above 8,000 tonnes from Jan 1, 2016) by burning kerosene in a dedicated inert gas generator. The inert gas system is used to prevent the atmosphere in cargo tanks or bunkers from coming into the explosive range. Inert gases keep the oxygen content of the tank atmosphere below 5% (on crude carriers, less for product carriers and gas tankers), thus making any air/hydrocarbon gas mixture in the tank too rich (too high a fuel to oxygen ratio) to ignite. Inert gases are most important during discharging and during the ballast voyage when more hydrocarbon vapor is likely to be present in the tank atmosphere. Inert gas can also be used to purge the tank of the volatile atmosphere in preparation for gas freeing - replacing the atmosphere with breathable air - or vice versa. The flue gas system uses the boiler exhaust as its source, so it is important that the fuel/air ratio in the boiler burners is properly regulated to ensure that high-quality inert gases are produced. Too much air would result in an oxygen content exceeding 5%, and too much fuel oil would result in the carryover of dangerous hydrocarbon gas. The flue gas is cleaned and cooled by the scrubber tower. Various safety devices prevent overpressure, the return of hydrocarbon gas to the engine room, or having a supply of IG with too high oxygen content.

Gas tankers and product carriers cannot rely on flue gas systems (because they require IG with O_{2} content of 1% or less) and so use inert gas generators instead. The inert gas generator consists of a combustion chamber and scrubber unit supplied by fans and a refrigeration unit which cools the gas. A drier in series with the system removes moisture from the gas before it is supplied to the deck. Cargo tanks on gas carriers are not inerted, but the whole space around them is.

=== Inert gas systems on aircraft ===
Inert gas is produced on board commercial and military aircraft in order to passivate fuel tanks. On hot days, fuel vapour in fuel tanks may otherwise form a flammable or explosive mixture which if oxidized, could have catastrophic consequences. Conventionally, Air Separation Modules (ASMs) have been used to generate inert gas. ASMs contain selectively permeable membranes. They are fed compressed bleed air from a gas turbine engine. The pressure drives the separation of oxygen from the air due to the increased permeability of oxygen through the ASMs in comparison to nitrogen. For fuel tank passivation, it is not necessary to remove all oxygen, but rather enough to stay below the lean flammability limit and the lean explosion limit. In contrast to the oxygen concentration of 21% in air, 10% to 12% in the ullage of a passivated fuel tank is common over the course of a flight.

=== Welding ===
In gas tungsten arc welding (GTAW), inert gases are used to shield the tungsten from contamination. It also shields the fluid metal (created from the arc) from the reactive gases in air which can cause porosity in the solidified weld puddle. Inert gases are also used in gas metal arc welding (GMAW) for welding non-ferrous metals. Some gases which are not usually considered inert but which behave like inert gases in all the circumstances likely to be encountered in some use can often be used as a substitute for an inert gas. This is useful when an appropriate pseudo-inert gas can be found which is inexpensive and common. For example, carbon dioxide is sometimes used in gas mixtures for GMAW because it is not reactive to the weld pool created by arc welding. But it is reactive to the arc. The more carbon dioxide that is added to the inert gas, such as argon, will increase penetration. The amount of carbon dioxide is often determined by what kind of transfer is used in GMAW. The most common in industrial applications is spray arc transfer, and the most commonly used gas mixture for spray arc transfer is 90% argon and 10% carbon dioxide. In non-industrial applications, short circuit transfer is most commonly used, particularly in the US. With short circuit transfer, a gas mixture made up of 75% argon and 25% carbon dioxide (referred to as C25) is most often used. Outside the US, a mixture of 80% argon and 20% carbon dioxide is often used.

=== Diving ===
In underwater diving an inert gas is a component of the breathing mixture which is not metabolically active and serves to dilute the gas mixture. The inert gas may have physiological effects on the diver, but these are thought to be mostly physical effects, such as tissue damage caused by bubbles in decompression sickness, heat loss due to heat conductivity and specific heat, and effects on work of breathing due to density. There may also be physiological effects on the nervous system such as nitrogen narcosis and high-pressure nervous syndrome, which are poorly understood, but are quick to reverse, with no lasting effects, on depressurisation, and do not appear to change the gas in any way other than solution. The most common inert gases used in breathing gas for diving are nitrogen and helium. Carbon dioxide is a metabolic product of respiration and has toxic effects at high partial pressures, so it is not classed as inert in this context.

== See also ==
- Breathing gas – Gas used for human respiration
- Industrial gas – Gaseous materials produced for use in industry
- Inerting system – System for inhibiting fuel tank combustion for aircraft
- Tank blanketing – Filling ullage with a protecive gas
- Purging (gas) – Use of an inert gas to prevent formation of ignitable atmosphere, a fire and explosion prevention procedure to avoid the formation of an ignitable atmosphere, accomplished by flushing a closed system with an inert gas
- Inerting (gas) – Introduction of inert gas to a closed system, a fire and explosion prevention procedure to make an ignitable atmosphere safe, accomplished by injecting an inert gas
