= United States federal academies =

United States federal education institutions

There are nineteen federal academies run by the United States federal government.

Five are United States service academies:

- United States Military Academy, also known as "West Point" and "Army", founded 1802
- United States Naval Academy, also known as "Annapolis" and "Navy", founded 1845
- United States Air Force Academy, founded 1954
- United States Coast Guard Academy, founded 1876
- United States Merchant Marine Academy, also known as "Kings Point", founded 1942

Nine other academies can be loosely classified as a military academy, most of which are graduate schools:

- Uniformed Services University of the Health Sciences, founded 1972
- The National Defense University, also known as "NDU", founded 1976
- The National Intelligence University, also known as "NIU", established 1962
- Air Force Institute of Technology
- Air War College
- Marine Corps University
- Naval Postgraduate School
- Naval War College
- United States Army Command and General Staff College
- United States Army War College

There are five federal non-military academies:

- The Foreign Service Institute, founded 1947
- The Federal Law Enforcement Training Center, founded 1970
- United States National Mine Health and Safety Academy, founded 1971
- The FBI Academy, founded 1972
- The National Fire Academy, also known as "NFA", founded in 1976

== See also ==
- List of defunct United States military academies
