= Limiting oxygen concentration =

Concentration of oxygen below which combustion is not possible

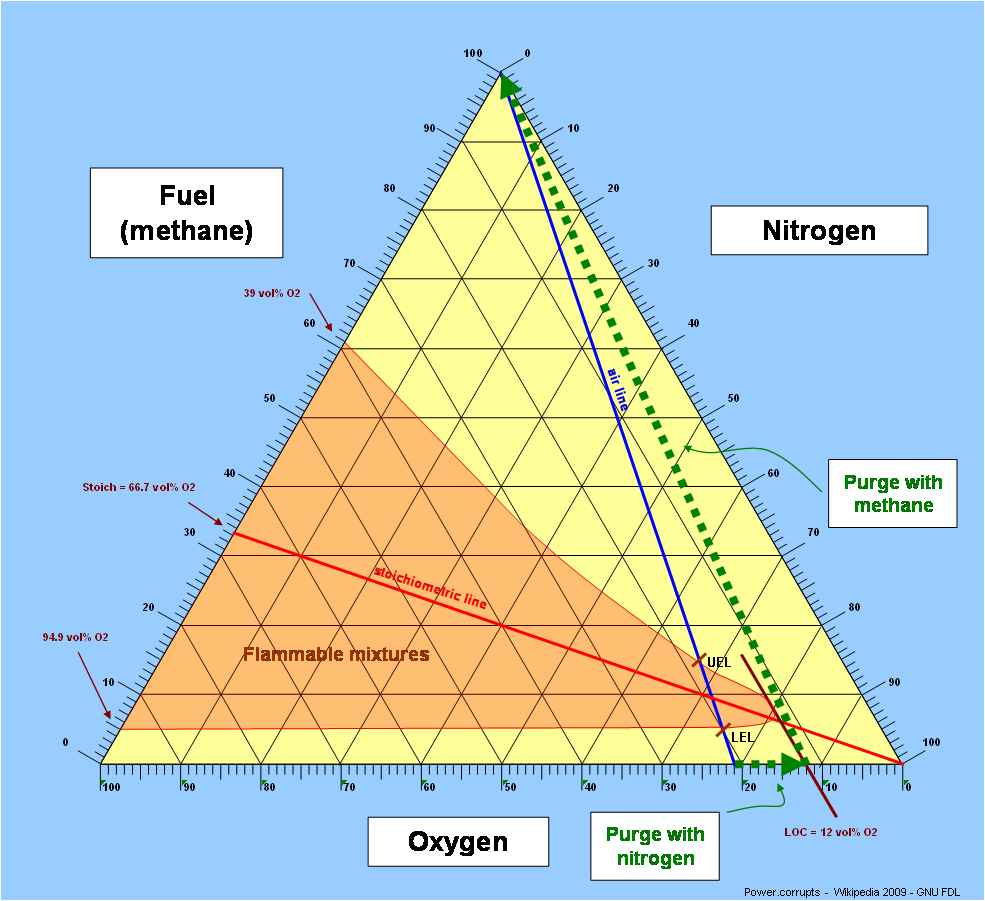
Flammability diagram, green dotted line shows safe purging of an air-filled vessel, first with nitrogen, then with methane, to avoid the flammable region. The limiting oxygen concentration is shown in the lower right of the diagram.

The limiting oxygen concentration (LOC), also known as the minimum oxygen concentration (MOC), is defined as the limiting concentration of oxygen below which combustion is not possible, independent of the concentration of fuel. It is expressed in units of volume percent of oxygen. The LOC varies with pressure and temperature. It is also dependent on the type of inert (non-flammable) gas.

Limiting oxygen concentration for selected gases and two inerts (volume percent oxygen)
Gas or vapor	Nitrogen / Air	Carbon dioxide / Air
Hydrogen	5	5.2
Methane	12	14.5
Ethane	11	13.5
Propane	11.5	14.5
n-Butane	12	14.5
Isobutane	12	15

Limiting oxygen concentration for solid materials

Material	Nitrogen/Air
PE-HD	16.0
PP	16.0
PMMA	15.9
PVC	16.9
PE-LD	15.9
Fir wood	17.0
Corrugated board	15.0
Cardboard palletised	15.0
Paper	14.1

The effect of increasing the concentration of inert gas can be understood by viewing the inert as thermal ballast that quenches the flame temperature to a level below which the flame cannot exist. Carbon dioxide is therefore more effective than nitrogen due to its higher molar heat capacity.

The concept has important practical use in fire safety engineering. For instance, to safely fill a new container or a pressure vessel with flammable gases, the atmosphere of normal air (containing 20.9 volume percent of oxygen) in the vessel would first be flushed (purged) with nitrogen or another non-flammable inert gas, thereby reducing the oxygen concentration inside the container. When the oxygen concentration is below the LOC, flammable gas can then be safely admitted to the vessel, because the possibility of internal explosion has been eliminated.

The limiting oxygen concentration is a necessary parameter when designing hypoxic air fire prevention systems.

== See also ==
- Flammability limit
- Flammability diagram

== Sources ==
Monographs

- Green, Don W.; Robert H. Perry (October 23, 2007). Perry's Chemical Engineers' Handbook. McGraw-Hill Professional; 8 edition. ISBN 978-0-07-142294-9. Chapter 23
- Drysdale, Dougal (1985). An Introduction to Fire Dynamics. Wiley. ISBN 0-471-90613-1.
- W. O. Möller; M. Molnarne; R. Sturm (1998). "Limiting Oxygen Concentration: Recent Results and their Presentation in Chemsafe". Physikalisch-Technische Bundesanstalt (Germany). (Presented at 9th International Symposium on Loss Prevention and Safety Promotion in the Process Industries, May 1998, Barcelona (Spain))
