= Foreign Service specialist =

A Foreign Service specialist (FSS) is direct-hire career employee of the United States Department of State or another foreign affairs agency. Legally established as "foreign service personnel," one of the seven member categories of the United States Foreign Service, they are informally known as "specialists" to distinguish them from "officers" who are a different category in the service. They are members of the United States Foreign Service who provide important technical, support, or administrative services in nineteen career categories, including diplomatic security special agents, doctors and physician assistants, diplomatic technology officers, office management specialists, and human resource specialists. They serve in over 290 embassies or consulates abroad, Washington, D.C. or other locations in the continental United States.

== Differences between officer and specialist ==
While both Foreign Service officers and Foreign Service specialists serve in diplomatic assignments, FSOs are commissioned under Article II of the Constitution after being nominated by the president and approved by Congress. As such, FSOs are charged with conducting diplomacy on behalf of the United States. FSSs, on the other hand, are appointed by the Secretary of State, are not confirmed by the Senate, do not hold commissions and are considered support staff that enable the conduct of diplomacy. The system is modeled after the U.S. Navy in which line officers (surface warfare, aviation, etc.) are supported by staff officers (JAG, medical, etc.). All serve in a series of overseas assignments at U.S. embassies and consulates around the world for much of their careers, with some domestic postings in Washington, D.C. or other locations in the continental United States. The selection processes for specialists and officers differ, although all include an oral assessment, medical and security clearances, and a suitability review. Most officers are actually appointed as foreign service personnel while they are foreign service officer candidates, but once confirmed in the service following a tenure review period, they are re-categorized from foreign service personnel to foreign service officer. Additionally, specialists may be expected to serve within their functional area throughout their careers, while officers typically will have some assignments over the course of a career that are inter-functional or in a different career track. For example, whatever the career track, entry-level officers (foreign service officer candidates) usually serve in one consular or management assignment during the first two tours.

== Career tracks ==
- Facilities maintenance specialist
- Financial management officer
- General services officer
- Human resources officer
- Construction engineer
- Diplomatic technology officer
- Language officer
- Regional English language officer
- Information resource officer
- Printing specialist (limited noncareer appointment)
- Health practitioner
- Regional medical technologist
- Regional medical officer
- Regional medical officer/psychiatrist
- Office management specialist
- Diplomatic courier
- Security engineering officer
- Security protective specialist (limited noncareer appointment)
- Security technical specialist
- Diplomatic Security Service special agent

In extremely rare cases when no Foreign Service specialists are available, non-career appointees can be considered for entry as FS specialists, providing they meet rigorous standards expected of career members of the Service. Limited noncareer appointees are not officially part of the Foreign Service and must leave anytime a career person becomes available for their positions. This is a legal requirement negotiated with various labor organizations.

== Allowances and benefits ==
Foreign Travel Per Diem Allowances: The foreign travel per diem allowances provide for lodging, meals, and incidental expenses when an employee is on temporary duty overseas. While the Office of Allowances is responsible for setting foreign per diem rates, per diem travel policy, both foreign and domestic, is governed by the Federal Travel Regulation (FTR) and not by the DSSR.

Cost-of-Living Allowances: The cost-of-living allowances are those allowances that are designed to reimburse employees for certain excess costs that they incur as a result of their employment overseas. This group includes the Post Allowance (more commonly referred to as the COLA), Foreign Transfer Allowance, Home Service Transfer Allowance, Separate Maintenance Allowance, Education Allowance, and Educational Travel. Cost-of-living allowances are not considered a part of taxable income.

Recruitment and Retention Incentives: These allowances are designed to recruit employees to posts where living conditions may be difficult or dangerous. Post Hardship Differential, Danger Pay, and Difficult-to-Staff Incentive Differential (also known as Service-Needs Differential) are all considered recruitment and retention allowances. They are included in taxable income.

Quarters Allowances: Quarters Allowances, which include the Living Quarters Allowance, Temporary Quarters Subsistence Allowance, and Extraordinary Quarters Allowance, are intended to reimburse employees for substantially all housing costs, either temporary or permanent, at overseas posts where government housing is not provided. These allowances are not included in taxable income.

Other Allowances: Other allowances include ORE (Official Residence Expense), Representation Allowance, evacuation-related payments, and Advance of Pay.

== See also ==
- Foreign Service Officer
- United States Foreign Service
- United States Department of State
