= Flammability limit =

Burning within well-defined lower and upper bounds

Flammability limits or explosive limits are the ranges of fuel concentrations in relation to oxygen from the air. Combustion can range in violence from deflagration through detonation.

Limits vary with temperature and pressure, but are normally expressed in terms of volume percentage at 25 °C and atmospheric pressure. These limits are relevant both in producing and optimising explosion or combustion, as in an engine, or to preventing it, as in uncontrolled explosions of build-ups of combustible gas or dust. Attaining the best combustible or explosive mixture of a fuel and air (the stoichiometric proportion) is important in internal combustion engines such as gasoline or diesel engines.

The standard reference work is still that elaborated by Michael George Zabetakis, a fire safety engineering specialist, using an apparatus developed by the United States Bureau of Mines.

== Violence of combustion ==
Combustion can vary in degree of violence. A deflagration is a propagation of a combustion zone at a velocity less than the speed of sound in the unreacted medium. A detonation is a propagation of a combustion zone at a velocity greater than the speed of sound in the unreacted medium. An explosion is the bursting or rupture of an enclosure or container due to the development of internal pressure from a deflagration or detonation as defined in NFPA 69.

== Limits ==
Any mixture of combustibles has specific lower and upper flammability limits. These limits are a function of the pressure, temperature and composition. These limits are often shown in flammability diagrams for which an example can be found in the work by Bee and Börner.

=== Lower flammability limit ===
Lower flammability limit (LFL): The lowest concentration (percentage) of a gas or a vapor in air capable of producing a flash of fire in the presence of an ignition source (arc, flame, heat). The term is considered by many safety professionals to be the same as the lower explosive level (LEL). At a concentration in air lower than the LFL, gas mixtures are "too lean" to burn. Methane gas has an LFL of 4.4%. If the atmosphere has less than 4.4% methane, an explosion cannot occur even if a source of ignition is present. From the health and safety perspective, the LEL concentration is considered to be Immediately Dangerous to Life or Health (IDLH), where a more stringent exposure limit does not exist for the flammable gas.

Percentage reading on combustible air monitors should not be confused with the LFL concentrations. Explosimeters designed and calibrated to a specific gas may show the relative concentration of the atmosphere to the LFL—the LFL being 100%. A 5% displayed LFL reading for methane, for example, would be equivalent to 5% multiplied by 4.4%, or approximately 0.22% methane by volume at 20 degrees C. Control of the explosion hazard is usually achieved by sufficient natural or mechanical ventilation, to limit the concentration of flammable gases or vapors to a maximum level of 25% of their lower explosive or flammable limit.

=== Upper flammability limit ===
Upper flammability limit (UFL): Highest concentration (percentage) of a gas or a vapor in air capable of producing a flash of fire in the presence of an ignition source (arc, flame, heat). Concentrations higher than UFL or UEL are "too rich" to burn. Operating above the UFL is usually avoided for safety because air leaking in can bring the mixture into combustibility range.

=== Influence of temperature, pressure and composition ===
Flammability limits of mixtures of several combustible gases can be calculated using Le Chatelier's mixing rule for combustible volume fractions $x_i$:

$$LFL_{\text{mix}}=\frac{1}{\sum_i \frac{x_{i}}{LFL_{i}}}$$

and similar for UFL.

Temperature, pressure, and the concentration of the oxidizer also influences flammability limits. Higher temperature or pressure, as well as higher concentration of the oxidizer (primarily oxygen in air), results in lower LFL and higher UFL, hence the gas mixture will be easier to explode.

Usually atmospheric air supplies the oxygen for combustion, and limits assume the normal concentration of oxygen in air. Oxygen-enriched atmospheres enhance combustion, lowering the LFL and increasing the UFL, and vice versa; an atmosphere devoid of an oxidizer is neither flammable nor explosive for any fuel concentration (except for gases that can energetically decompose even in the absence of an oxidizer, such as acetylene). Significantly increasing the fraction of inert gases in an air mixture, at the expense of oxygen, increases the LFL and decreases the UFL.

== Controlling explosive atmospheres ==
=== Gas and vapor ===
Controlling gas and vapor concentrations outside the flammable limits is a major consideration in occupational safety and health. Methods used to control the concentration of a potentially explosive gas or vapor include use of sweep gas, an unreactive gas such as nitrogen or argon to dilute the explosive gas before coming in contact with air. Use of scrubbers or adsorption resins to remove explosive gases before release are also common. Gases can also be maintained safely at concentrations above the UEL, although a breach in the storage container can lead to explosive conditions or intense fires.

=== Dusts ===
Dusts also have upper and lower explosion limits, though the upper limits are hard to measure and of little practical importance. Lower flammability limits for many organic materials are in the range of 10–50 g/m^{3}, which is much higher than the limits set for health reasons, as is the case for the LEL of many gases and vapours. Dust clouds of this concentration are hard to see through for more than a short distance, and normally only exist inside process equipment.

Flammability limits also depend on the particle size of the dust involved, and are not intrinsic properties of the material. In addition, a concentration above the LEL can be created suddenly from settled dust accumulations, so management by routine monitoring, as is done with gases and vapours, is of no value. The preferred method of managing combustible dust is by preventing accumulations of settled dust through process enclosure, ventilation, and surface cleaning. However, lower flammability limits may be relevant to plant design.

=== Volatile liquids ===
Situations caused by evaporation of flammable liquids into the air-filled void volume of a container may be limited by flexible container volume or by using an immiscible fluid to fill the void volume. Hydraulic tankers use displacement of water when filling a tank with petroleum.

== Examples ==
The flammable/explosive limits of some gases and vapors are given below. Concentrations are given in percent by volume of air.

- Class IA liquids with a flash point less than 73 °F (23 °C) and boiling point less than 100 °F (38 °C) have a NFPA 704 flammability rating of 4
- Class IB liquids with a flash point less than 73 °F (23 °C) and a boiling point equal to or greater than 100 °F (38 °C) and class IC liquids with a flash point equal to or greater than 73 °F (23 °C), but less than 100 °F (38 °C) have a NFPA 704 flammability rating of 3
- Class II liquids with a flash point equal to or greater than 100 °F (38 °C), but less than 140 °F (60 °C) and class IIIA liquids with a flash point equal to or greater than 140 °F (60 °C), but less than 200 °F (93 °C) have a NFPA 704 flammability rating of 2
- Class IIIB liquids with a flash point equal to or greater than 200 °F (93 °C) have a NFPA 704 flammability rating of 1

Substance		Flammability limit (%vol.)		NFPA class	Flash point	Minimum ignition energy (mJ) @ proportion in air at which achieved (Note: Note that for many chemicals it takes the least amount of ignition energy halfway between the LEL and UEL.)	Autoignition temperature
Substance		Lower	Upper	NFPA class	Flash point	Minimum ignition energy (mJ) @ proportion in air at which achieved	Autoignition temperature
Acetaldehyde		4.0	57.0	IA	−39 °C	0.37	175 °C
Acetic acid (glacial)		4	19.9	II	39–43 °C		463 °C
Acetic anhydride				II	54 °C		
Acetone		2.6–3	12.8–13	IB	−17 °C	1.15 @ 4.5%	465 °C, 485 °C
Acetonitrile				IB	2 °C		524 °C
Acetyl chloride		7.3	19	IB	5 °C		390 °C
Acetylene		2.5	100	IA	Flammable gas	0.017 @ 8.5%; 0.0002 @ 40%, in pure oxygen	305 °C
Acrolein		2.8	31	IB	−26 °C	0.13	
Acrylonitrile		3.0	17.0	IB	0 °C	0.16 @ 9.0%	
Allyl chloride		2.9	11.1	IB	−32 °C	0.77	
Ammonia		15	28	IIIB	11 °C	680	651 °C
Arsine		4.5–5.1	78	IA	Flammable gas		
Benzene		1.2	7.8	IB	−11 °C	0.2 @ 4.7%	560 °C
1,3-Butadiene		2.0	12	IA	−85 °C	0.13 @ 5.2%	
Butane, n-butane		1.6	8.4	IA	−60 °C	0.25 @ 4.7%	420–500 °C
n-Butyl acetate, butyl acetate		1–1.7	8–15	IB	24 °C		370 °C
2-Butanol		1.7	9.8		29 °C		405 °C
Isobutanol		1.7	10.9		22–27 °C		415 °C
n-Butanol		1.4	11.2	IC	35 °C		340 °C
n-Butyl chloride, 1-chlorobutane		1.8	10.1	IB	−6 °C	1.24	
n-Butyl mercaptan		1.4	10.2	IB	2 °C		225 °C
Butyl methyl ketone, 2-hexanone		1	8	IC	25 °C		423 °C
Butylene, 1-butylene, 1-butene		1.98	9.65	IA	−80 °C		
Carbon disulfide		1.0	50.0	IB	−30 °C	0.009 @ 7.8%	90 °C
Carbon monoxide		12	75	IA	−191 °C Flammable gas		609 °C
Chlorine monoxide				IA	Flammable gas		
1-Chloro-1,1-difluoroethane		6.2	17.9	IA	−65 °C Flammable gas		
Cyanogen		6.0–6.6	32–42.6	IA	Flammable gas		
Cyclobutane		1.8	11.1	IA	−63.9 °C		426.7 °C
Cyclohexane		1.3	7.8–8	IB	−18 – −20 °C	0.22 @ 3.8%	245 °C
Cyclohexanol		1	9	IIIA	68 °C		300 °C
Cyclohexanone		1–1.1	9–9.4	II	43.9–44 °C		420 °C
Cyclopentadiene				IB	0 °C	0.67	640 °C
Cyclopentane		1.5–2	9.4	IB	−37 – −38.9 °C	0.54	361 °C
Cyclopropane		2.4	10.4	IA	−94.4 °C	0.17 @ 6.3%	498 °C
Decane		0.8	5.4	II	46.1 °C		210 °C
Diborane		0.8	88	IA	−90 °C Flammable gas		38 °C
o-Dichlorobenzene, 1,2-dichlorobenzene		2	9	IIIA	65 °C		648 °C
1,1-Dichloroethane		6	11	IB	14 °C		
1,2-Dichloroethane		6	16	IB	13 °C		413 °C
1,1-Dichloroethene		6.5	15.5	IA	−10 °C Flammable gas		
Dichlorofluoromethane			54.7		Non flammable, −36.1 °C		552 °C
Dichloromethane, methylene chloride		16	66		Non flammable		
Dichlorosilane		4–4.7	96	IA	−28 °C	0.015	
Diesel fuel		0.6	7.5	IIIA	>62 °C		210 °C
Diethanolamine		2	13	IB	169 °C		
Diethylamine		1.8	10.1	IB	−23 – −26 °C		312 °C
Diethyl disulfide		1.2		II	38.9 °C		
Diethyl ether		1.9–2	36–48	IA	−45 °C	0.19 @ 5.1%	160–170 °C
Diethyl sulfide				IB	−10 °C		
1,1-Difluoroethane		3.7	18	IA	−81.1 °C		
1,1-Difluoroethylene		5.5	21.3		−126.1 °C		
Difluoromethane		14.4					
Diisobutyl ketone		1	6		49 °C		
Diisopropyl ether		1	21	IB	−28 °C		
Dimethylamine		2.8	14.4	IA	Flammable gas		
1,1-Dimethylhydrazine				IB			
Dimethyl sulfide				IA	−49 °C		
Dimethyl sulfoxide		2.6–3	42	IIIB	88–95 °C		215 °C
1,4-Dioxane		2	22	IB	12 °C		
Epichlorohydrin		4	21		31 °C		
Ethane		3	12–12.4	IA	Flammable gas, −135 °C		515 °C
Ethanol, ethyl alcohol		3–3.3	19	IB	12.8 °C		365 °C
2-Ethoxyethanol		3	18		43 °C		
2-Ethoxyethyl acetate		2	8		56 °C		
Ethyl acetate		2	12	IA	−4 °C		460 °C
Ethylamine		3.5	14	IA	−17 °C		
Ethylbenzene		1.0	7.1		15–20 °C		
Ethylene		2.7	36	IA		0.07	490 °C
Ethylene glycol		3	22		111 °C		
Ethylene oxide		3	100	IA	−20 °C		
Ethyl chloride		3.8	15.4	IA	−50 °C		
Ethyl mercaptan				IA			
Fuel oil No.1		0.7	5				
Furan		2	14	IA	−36 °C		
Gasoline (100 octane)		1.4	7.6	IB	< −40 °C		246–280 °C
Glycerol		3	19		199 °C		
Heptane, n-heptane		1.05	6.7		−4 °C	0.24 @ 3.4%	204–215 °C
Hexane, n-hexane		1.2	7.5		−22 °C	0.24 @ 3.8%	225 °C, 233 °C
Hydrogen		4/18.3	75/59	IA	Flammable gas	0.016 @ 28%; 0.0012, in pure oxygen	500–571 °C
Hydrogen sulfide		4.3	46	IA	Flammable gas	0.068	
Isobutane		1.8	9.6	IA	Flammable gas		462 °C
Isobutyl alcohol		2	11		28 °C		
Isophorone		1	4		84 °C		
Isopropyl alcohol, isopropanol		2	12	IB	12 °C		398–399 °C; 425 °C
Isopropyl chloride				IA			
Kerosene Jet A-1		0.6–0.7	4.9–5	II	>38 °C, as jet fuel		210 °C
Lithium hydride				IA			
2-Mercaptoethanol				IIIA			
Methane (natural gas)	ISO10156	5.0	14.3	IA	Flammable gas	0.21 @ 8.5%	580 °C
Methane (natural gas)	IEC60079-20-1	4.4	17	IA	Flammable gas	0.21 @ 8.5%	580 °C
Methyl acetate		3	16		−10 °C		
Methyl alcohol, methanol		6–6.7	36	IB	11 °C		385 °C; 455 °C
Methylamine				IA	8 °C		
Methyl chloride		10.7	17.4	IA	−46 °C		
Methyl ether				IA	−41 °C		
Methyl ethyl ether				IA			
Methyl ethyl ketone		1.8	10	IB	−6 °C		505–515 °C
Methyl formate				IA			
Methyl mercaptan		3.9	21.8	IA	−53 °C		
Mineral spirits		0.7	6.5		38–43 °C		258 °C
Morpholine		1.8	10.8	IC	31–37.7 °C		310 °C
Naphthalene		0.9	5.9	IIIA	79–87 °C		540 °C
Neohexane		1.19	7.58		−29 °C		425 °C
Nickel tetracarbonyl		2	34		4 °C		60 °C
Nitrobenzene		2	9	IIIA	88 °C		
Nitromethane		7.3	22.2		35 °C		379 °C
Octane		1	7		13 °C		
iso-Octane		0.79	5.94				
Pentane		1.5	7.8	IA	−40 – −49 °C	0.18 @ 4.4%, as 2-pentane	260 °C
n-Pentane		1.4	7.8	IA		0.28 @ 3.3%	
iso-Pentane		1.32	9.16	IA			420 °C
Phosphine				IA			
Propane		2.1	9.5–10.1	IA	Flammable gas	0.25 @ 5.2%; 0.0021, in pure oxygen	480 °C
Propyl acetate		2	8		13 °C		
Propylene		2.0	11.1	IA	−108 °C	0.28	458 °C
Propylene oxide		2.9	36	IA			
Pyridine		2	12		20 °C		
Silane		1.5	98	IA			<21 °C
Styrene		1.1	6.1	IB	31–32.2 °C		490 °C
Tetrafluoroethylene				IA			
Tetrahydrofuran		2	12	IB	−14 °C		321 °C
Toluene		1.2–1.27	6.75–7.1	IB	4.4 °C	0.24 @ 4.1%	480 °C; 535 °C
Triethylborane					−20 °C		−20 °C
Trimethylamine				IA	Flammable gas		
Trinitrobenzene				IA			
Turpentine		0.8		IC	35 °C		
Vegetable oil				IIIB	327 °C		
Vinyl acetate		2.6	13.4		−8 °C		
Vinyl chloride		3.6	33				
Xylenes		0.9–1.0	6.7–7.0	IC	27–32 °C	0.2	
m-Xylene		1.1	7	IC	25 °C		525 °C
o-Xylene				IC	17 °C		
p-Xylene		1.0	6.0	IC	27.2 °C		530 °C

== ASTM E681 ==
Image of a flame of R-32 (Difluoromethane) near its LFL in a 12 L ASTM E-681 apparatus.

In the U.S. the most common method of measuring LFLs and UFLs is ASTM E681. This standard test is required for HAZMAT Class 2 Gases and for determining refrigerant flammability classifications. This standard uses visual observations of flame propagation in 5 or 12 L spherical glass vessels to measure the flammability limits. Flammable conditions are defined as those for which a flame propagates outside a 90° cone angle.

== See also ==
- ATEX
- Flammability
- Limiting oxygen concentration
- Minimum ignition energy
