= La mission des grands travaux aéronautiques en Allemagne =

The Mission for Major Aeronautical Works in Germany La mission des grands travaux aéronautiques en Allemagne (MGTA) was a French government agency tasked with the construction of air bases in the territories controlled by France in occupied Germany after WWII. It was created on June 2, 1951. In 1965, its territorial jurisdiction was extended to the French sector in West Berlin. In 1966, the MGTA left German territory when the French president Charles de Gaulle decided to downgrade France's membership in NATO. The MGTA was legally dissolved in 1991.
