= Levy Jewish Chapel =

Levy Jewish Chapel may refer to:

- Commodore Levy Chapel, the Navy's oldest land-based Jewish Chapel, at Naval Station Norfolk, Virginia
- Commodore Uriah P. Levy Center and Jewish Chapel, United States Naval Academy
