= Commodore Levy Jewish Chapel =

Commodore Levy Jewish Chapel may refer to:

- Commodore Levy Chapel, the U.S. Navy's oldest land-based Jewish Chapel, at Naval Station Norfolk, Norfolk, Virginia
- Commodore Uriah P. Levy Center and Jewish Chapel, at the United States Naval Academy
