= Uriah P. Levy Chapel =

Uriah P. Levy Chapel may refer to:

- Commodore Levy Chapel, the U.S. Navy's oldest land-based Jewish Chapel
- Commodore Uriah P. Levy Center and Jewish Chapel, at the United States Naval Academy
