= List of LB&SCR B1 class locomotives =

Below are the names and numbers of the steam locomotives that comprised the LB&SCR B1 class, that ran on the London, Brighton and South Coast Railway, and latterly the Southern Railway network. The class names mainly relate to politicians and railway officials, or places served by the LB&SCR. All 36 locomotives were built at Brighton Works.

1st LBSC No.	LBSC Name	Built	2nd LBSC No.	1st SR No.	2ns SR No.	Withdrawn	Notes
172	Littlehampton	April 1891	—	B172	2172	September 1933	Last of class in service
173	Cottesloe	April 1891	—	B173	—	December 1926	
174	Fratton	December 1890	—	B174	—	December 1926	
175	Hayling	December 1890	—	—	—	December 1926	
176	Pevensey	November 1890	—	B176	—	February 1929	
177	Southsea	November 1890	—	B177	—	November 1926	
178	Leatherhead	June 1890	—	—	—	December 1912	
179	Sandown	May 1890	—	B179	—	June 1929	
180	Arundel	March 1890	—	B180	—	April 1925	
181	Croydon	February 1890	—	B181	—	December 1929	
182	Hastings	December 1889	—	—	—	July 1910	
183	Eastbourne	November 1889	—	—	—	January 1929	
184	Carew D Gilbert	September 1889	—	B184	—	June 1930	Renamed Stroudley in September 1906
185	George A Wallis	September 1889	—	—	—	February 1923	
186	De La Warr	June 1889	—	—	—	October 1911	
187	Philip Rose	June 1889	—	B187	—	December 1930	
188	Allen Sarle	April 1889	—	B188	—	June 1925	
189	Edward Blount	March 1889	—	—	—	December 1912	
190	Arthur Otway	December 1888	—	B190	—	April 1930	
191	Gordon-Lennox	November 1888	—	B191	—	December 1929	
192	Jacomb-Hood	October 1888	—	—	—	December 1927	Name removed c. 1906
193	Fremantle	October 1888	—	B193	—	September 1930	
194	Bickersteth	June 1888	—	B194	2194	July 1931	
195	Cardew	June 1888	—	—	—	December 1912	
196	Ralph L Lopes	May 1888	—	—	—	December 1912	
197	Jonas Levy	May 1888	—	B197	2197	August 1932	
198	Sheffield	December 1887	—	B198	—	December 1930	
199	Samuel Laing	December 1887	—	—	—	July 1925	
200	Beresford	December 1887	—	B200	—	April 1929	
214	Gladstone	December 1882	618	B214	—	April 1927	Purchased by the Stephenson Locomotive Society on withdrawal, Preserved at the National Railway Museum, York.
215	Salisbury	December 1883	—	—	—	April 1910	
216	Granville	December 1883	—	—	—	October 1911	
217	Northcote	December 1883	620	—	—	June 1927	
218	Beaconsfield	October 1885	—	—	—	June 1913	
219	Cleveland	October 1885	619	B619	—	December 1928	
220	Hampden	December 1887	—	—	—	January 1911	
