= Uriah P. Levy =

American naval officer and investor (1792–1862)

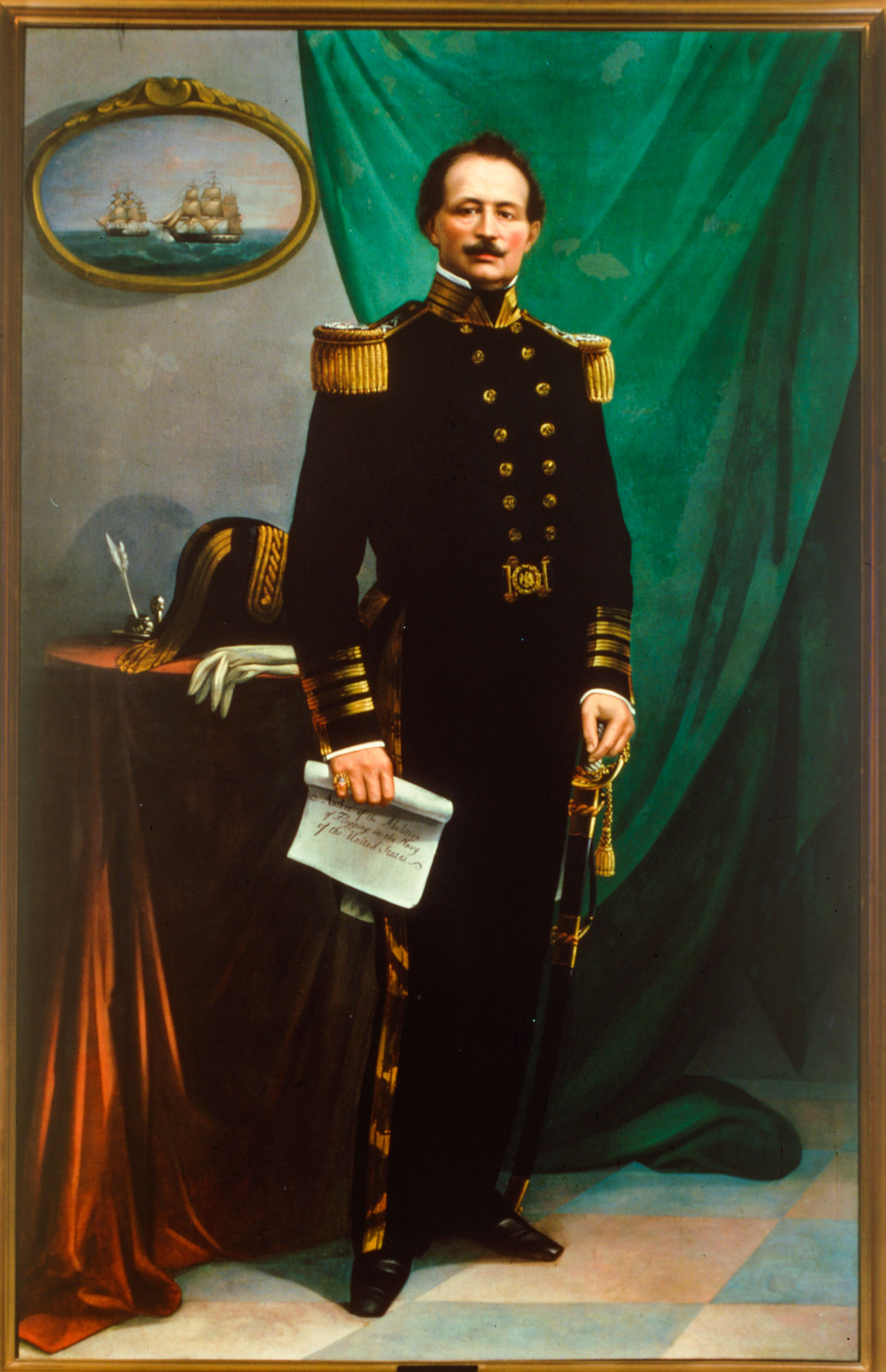
- Born: Uriah Phillips Levy; April 22, 1792; Philadelphia, Pennsylvania
- Died: March 22, 1862 (aged 69); New York City
- Burial place: Beth Olam Cemetery, Queens, New York
- Spouse: Virginia Lopez
- Military career
- Allegiance: United States of America
- Branch: United States Navy
- Service years: 1812-1862
- Rank: Commodore
- Commands: USS Vandalia; USS Macedonian; USS Franklin; Mediterranean Fleet
- Conflicts: War of 1812

Uriah Phillips Levy (April 22, 1792 – March 22, 1862) was a naval officer, real estate investor, and philanthropist. He was a veteran of the War of 1812 and the first Jewish Commodore of the United States Navy. (Note: At the time, Commodore was the highest rank in the U.S. Navy; it would be roughly equivalent to the modern-day rank of Admiral.) He was instrumental in helping to end the Navy's practice of flogging, and during his half-century-long service prevailed against the antisemitism he faced among some of his fellow naval officers.

An admirer of Thomas Jefferson, Levy purchased and began the restoration of Monticello in the 1830s. He also commissioned and donated a statue of Jefferson that is now located in the Capitol Rotunda; it is the only privately commissioned artwork in the Capitol.

== Early years ==
Levy was born on April 22, 1792, in Philadelphia, Pennsylvania to Michael and Rachel Phillips Levy. He had two older siblings. Uriah Levy was close to his maternal grandfather, Jonas Phillips, who had emigrated to the United States in 1756 from Germany, and fought with the Philadelphia militia in the American Revolution. His maternal great-great-grandfather, Dr. Samuel Ribeiro Nunes, a Portuguese physician, was among a group of 42 Sephardic Jews who escaped the Spanish Inquisition of the early 16th century and migrated to England, where they settled. Descendants of that group sailed from London in 1733 and helped found the city of Savannah, Georgia, where they lived for generations.

Levy's younger brother was Jonas Phillips Levy, who became a merchant and sea captain. He was the father of five, including the Congressman Jefferson Monroe Levy.

Levy ran away from home at the age of ten and ended up serving on various vessels as a cabin boy, and according to family stories, returned home to Philadelphia at age 13 for his bar mitzvah.

== Naval career ==
In 1806, he apprenticed as a sailor and was a cabin boy. Later he became a sailing master in the U.S. Navy, and fought in the Barbary Wars.

At the age of 21, he volunteered for the War of 1812 and was commissioned as a sailing master on October 21, 1812. He was a supernumerary sailing master on the Argus, which interdicted British ships in the English Channel. The Argus seized more than 20 vessels before being captured by a British warship on August 14, 1813; her captain was killed, and the crew, including Levy, surrendered and were taken prisoner. They were imprisoned in Great Britain for sixteen months until the end of the war. During his imprisonment, Levy had difficulty obtaining a subsidy and parole because his status as a supernumerary was not recognised by the British Transport Board.

Upon returning to the United States, Levy served aboard the Franklin as second master. Levy was promoted to the rank of lieutenant in 1817. This commission was a rare feat, given that he started as a cabin boy and worked his way to being a sailing master. He became a master commandant in 1837, and captain in 1844.

During his service in the U.S. Navy, Levy faced considerable antisemitism. He reacted to slights and was court-martialed six times, and once demoted from the rank of Captain. Twice, he was dismissed from the Navy, but reinstated. He defended his conduct in his handling of naval affairs before a Court of Inquiry and in 1855 was restored to his former position.

Later, Levy commanded the Mediterranean Squadron. As a squadron commander he was given the title of commodore, then the highest position in the U.S. Navy.

Levy was instrumental in abolishing flogging in the U.S. Navy, although his position was considered controversial at the time. He also helped gain the support of the U.S. Congress in passing an anti-flogging bill in 1850.

Levy spent only 16 years of his 49-year naval career in active service. The rest of time, he was listed as "waiting orders", meaning that he could be called to serve at any time. Although Levy served during the first year of the American Civil War, he was not given an active assignment at that time.

Levy became wealthy by investing in New York City's real estate market.

== Philanthropic activities ==
Levy undertook various philanthropic endeavors, many of which were in support of Jewish-American life. In 1854 he sponsored the new Jewish seminary of the B'nai Jeshurun Educational Institute in New York.

In 1833, New York City gave Levy the Key to the City after he presented the city with a patinated plaster statue of Thomas Jefferson, the one used to cast the bronze version he gave to the U.S. Congress. Before the statue was set up in New York City Hall, Levy installed it in a building on Broadway and charged admission to view it. The proceeds were used to buy bread for the city's poor.

== Monticello ==
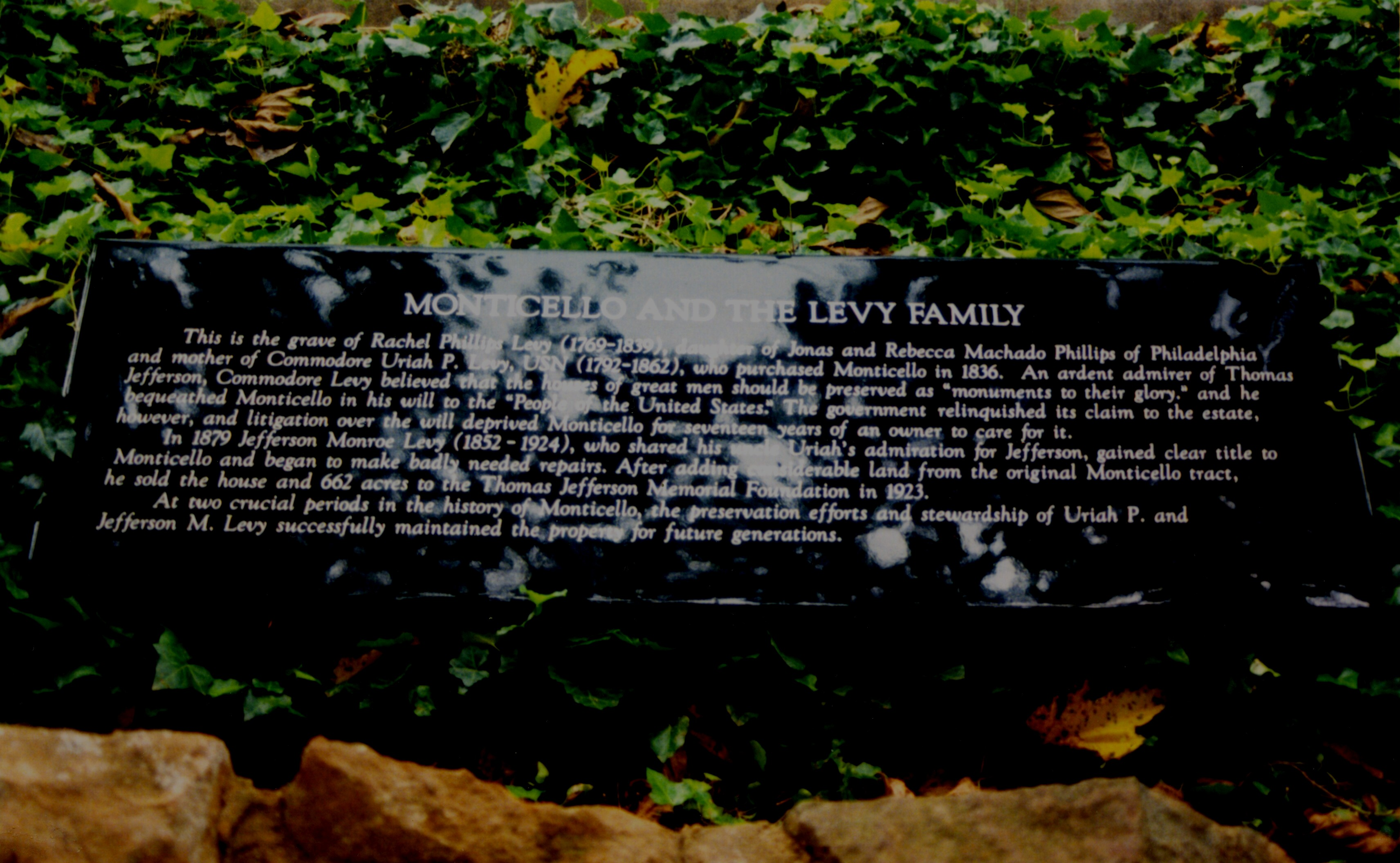
Levy's mother's grave

Levy was a great admirer of Thomas Jefferson:

I consider Thomas Jefferson to be one of the greatest men in history, the author of the Declaration and an absolute democrat. He serves as an inspiration to millions of Americans. He did much to mould our Republic in a form in which a man's religion does not make him ineligible for political or governmental life.

Monticello was sold by Jefferson's heirs (his daughter, Martha Jefferson Randolph and her son, Thomas Jefferson Randolph) to James Turner Barclay, a Charlottesville pharmacist, in 1831. In 1834, Levy bought it from Barclay for $2,700 218-acre (88 ha) Monticello—which is equivalent to $87,100 in today's dollars. Levy undertook to have the long-neglected home repaired, restored, and preserved. He bought hundreds of additional acres that had been part of the plantation, to add to what was left. He also purchased 12 enslaved people to work at Monticello, eventually owning about 20 during his tenure.

Levy used Monticello as a vacation home. From 1837 to 1839, his widowed mother Rachel Levy lived there until her death; she is buried along Mulberry Row, the main plantation street adjacent to the mansion.

Upon his death in 1862, Levy left Monticello to the American people to be used as an agricultural school for the orphans of Navy warrant officers. Because of the American Civil War, Congress refused to accept the donation. The Confederate government seized and sold the property; lawyers for Levy's estate recovered the property after the war.

Following two lawsuits by family members over Levy's will, with 47 parties to the suit, in 1879 his nephew Jefferson Monroe Levy bought out the other heirs for $10,050 (~$285,958 in 2024), and took control of Monticello. He had it repaired and restored. He sold it in 1923 to the Thomas Jefferson Memorial Foundation, which has renovated and restored the property as a house museum.

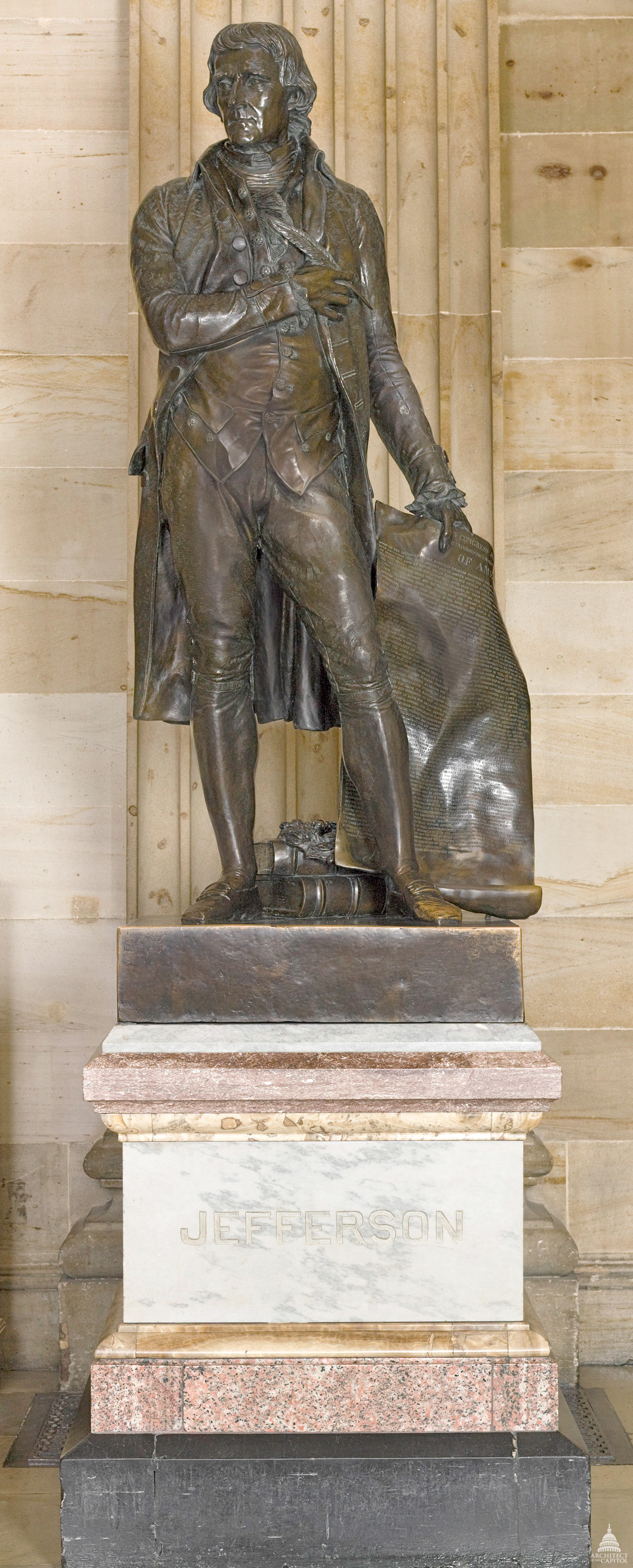
Statue of Jefferson in the Capitol.

The Levy family's role in preserving Monticello was downplayed by the Thomas Jefferson Foundation through much of the 20th century, which Urofsky suggests was due to antisemitic views among some of its board and members.

In 1985, the Thomas Jefferson Foundation restored the gravesite of Rachel Levy and honored descendants of the family in a ceremony at Monticello. The Foundation also celebrates the roles of Uriah P. Levy and Jefferson Monroe Levy in helping preserve and restore Monticello, including on-site information about their roles.

== Jefferson statue ==
In another tribute to Jefferson, Levy commissioned a bronze statue of the President from the noted sculptor Pierre-Jean David d’Angers in Paris. The statue depicts Jefferson holding a quill pen in his right hand and an etched copy of the Declaration of Independence in his left. Levy presented a black-painted plaster model of the Jefferson statue to the City of New York on February 6, 1833. The city gave him a gold snuff box in appreciation. That statue was placed on the second floor of the Rotunda at City Hall in Manhattan, and moved into the ornate City Council Chamber in the 1950s. It was moved from the Chamber on November 22, 2021, and loaned to The New-York Historical Society . Levy had donated the bronze statue to Congress in 1834. The statue, which once stood on the White House North Lawn from 1834 to 1873 and currently stands in the Capitol Rotunda, is the only privately commissioned piece of artwork in the Capitol.

== Personal life ==
Levy's brother, Jonas Phillip Levy, served as the fifth president of the Washington Hebrew Congregation in Washington, DC from 1857 to 1858.

At the age of 61, Levy married his 18-year-old niece Virginia Lopez, whose father had recently died. According to biographer Marc Leepson, Levy "was following an ancient, if obscure, Jewish tradition that obligates the closest unmarried male relative of a recently orphaned or widowed woman in financial difficulties to marry her." (See also letter, levirate marriage)

Levy died on March 26, 1862, and was buried in Beth Olam Cemetery, Ridgewood (Queens), associated with the Spanish and Portuguese Synagogue. He was one of the ranking officers of the Navy at the time of his death.

== Dates of rank ==
- Sailing Master – 21 October 1812
- Lieutenant – 5 March 1817
- Master Commandant – 9 February 1837
- Captain – 29 March 1844

== Legacy and honors ==
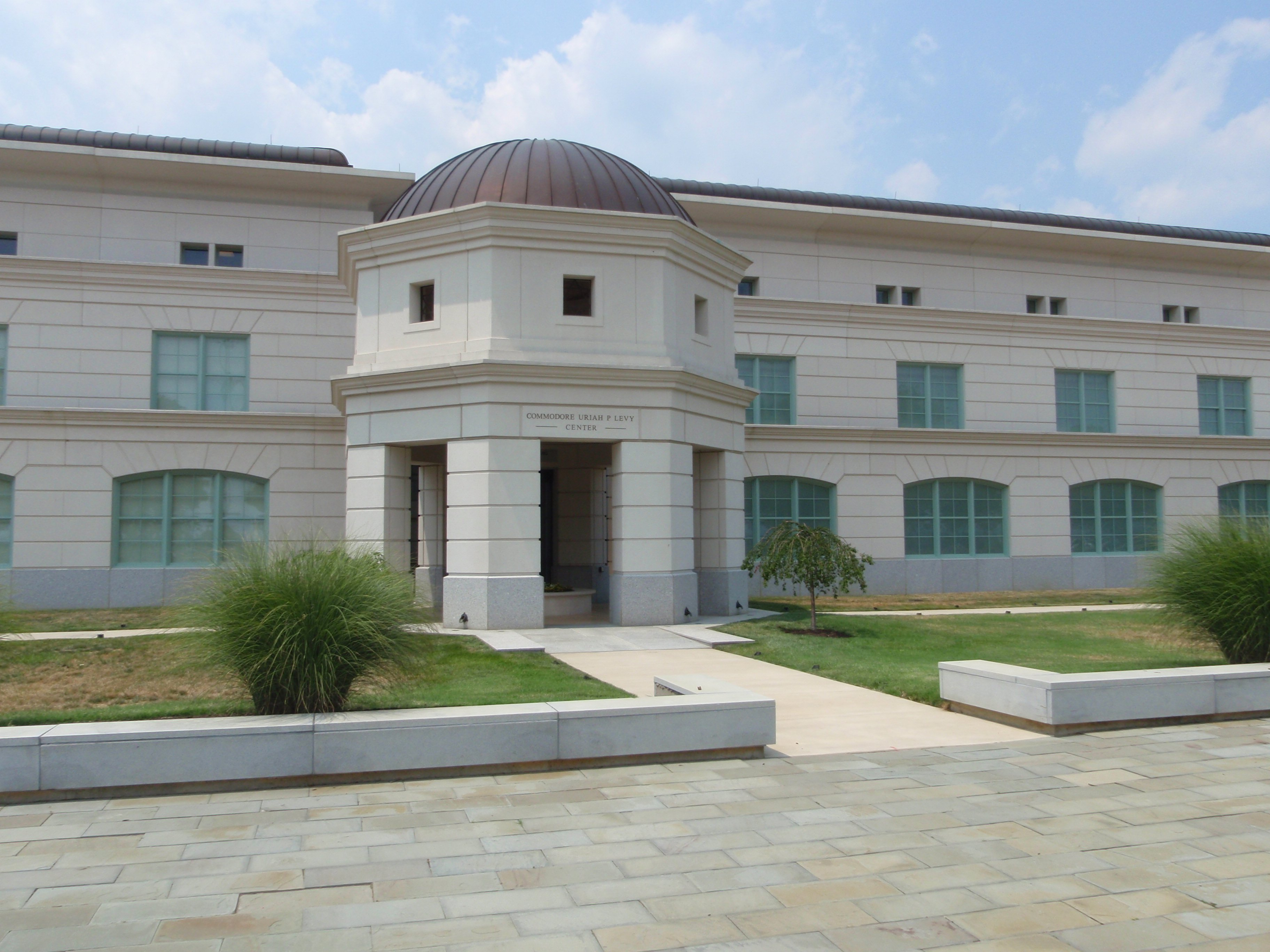
The Commodore Uriah P. Levy Center and Jewish Chapel, U.S. Naval Academy, Annapolis, Maryland

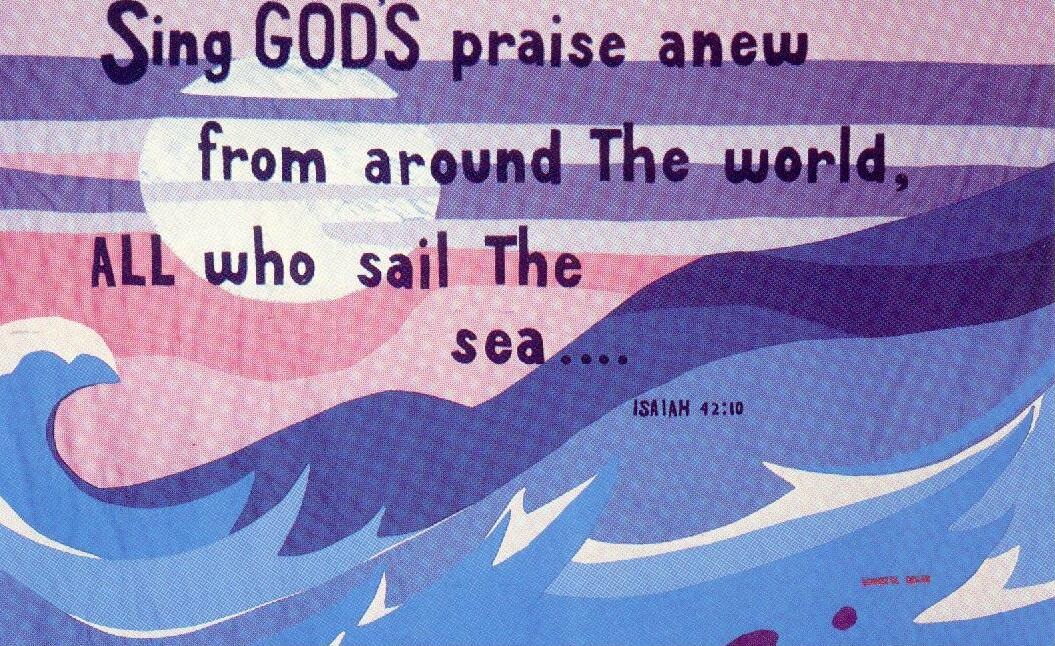
Wall-hanging in Commodore Levy Chapel, Naval Station Norfolk

- 1942, the Cannon class destroyer escort, the Levy (DE-162) was named in his honor. At the conclusion of World War II, the Levy hosted the U.S. representative for the surrender of Wake Island.
- 1959, Commodore Levy Chapel, the Jewish Chapel at Naval Station Norfolk, Norfolk, Virginia is renamed in his honor.
- 1988, listed in the Jewish-American Hall of Fame
- 2001, the Thomas Jefferson Foundation published The Levy Family and Monticello 1834–1923, a history of the Levy family's nearly century-long contributions in saving Monticello.
- 2005, the Commodore Uriah P. Levy Center and Jewish Chapel opened at the United States Naval Academy in Annapolis, Maryland, which is named in his honor.
- 2011 A statue of Uriah P. Levy by the Russian sculptor Gregory Pototsky was dedicated on December 16, 2011, outside Mikveh Israel Synagogue on Independence Mall in Philadelphia. The statue pedestal was designed by John Giungo.

== Published works ==
- Levy, Uriah Phillips; Butler, Benjamin F. (1858). Defence of Uriah P. Levy: Before the court of inquiry held at Washington City, November and December, 1857 (ebook). Washington D.C.: W.C. Gardner. Archived from the original on January 13, 2016.
- Levy, Uriah Phillips; Stimers, Alban C. (1862). Manual of Rules and Regulations for Men-of-war. New York: D. Van Nostrand. p. 88. (Google eBook)

== See also ==
- Monticello
- United States Naval Academy
