= USS Levy =

Cannon-class destroyer escort

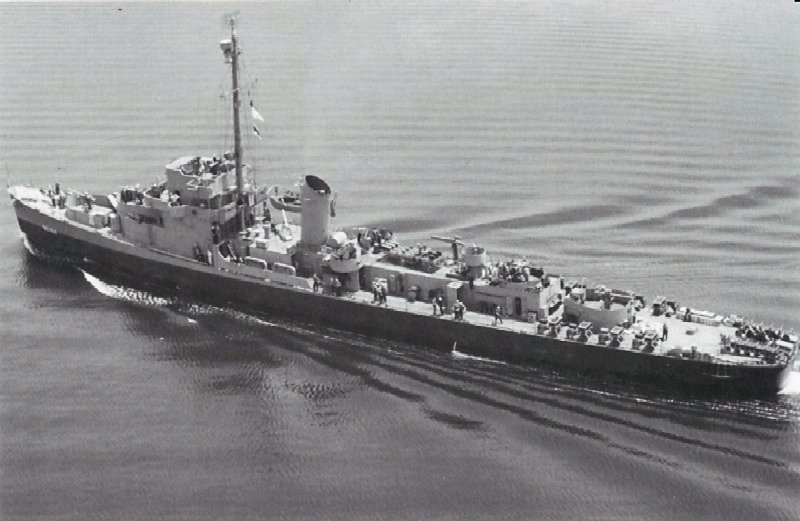

History

United States
- Name: USS Levy (DE-162)
- Namesake: Uriah P. Levy
- Ordered: Unknown
- Builder: Federal Shipbuilding and Drydock Company, Newark, New Jersey
- Laid down: 19 October 1942
- Launched: 28 March 1943
- Commissioned: 13 May 1943
- Decommissioned: 4 April 1947
- Stricken: 2 August 1973
- Honours and awards: 5 battle stars (World War II)
- Fate: Sold for scrap, 17 July 1974

General characteristics
- Class & type: Cannon-class destroyer escort
- Displacement: 1,240 long tons (1,260 t) standard; 1,620 long tons (1,646 t) full
- Length: 306 ft (93 m) o/a; 300 ft (91 m) w/l
- Beam: 36 ft 10 in (11.23 m)
- Draft: 11 ft 8 in (3.56 m)
- Propulsion: 4 × GM Mod. 16-278A diesel engines with electric drive, 6,000 shp (4,474 kW), 2 screws
- Speed: 21 knots (39 km/h; 24 mph)
- Range: 10,800 nmi (20,000 km) at 12 kn (22 km/h; 14 mph)
- Complement: 15 officers and 201 enlisted
- Armament: 3 single × Mk.22 3-inch/50-caliber guns; 8 × 20 mm Mk.4 AA guns; 3 × 21 inch (533 mm) torpedo tubes; 1 × Hedgehog Mk.10 anti-submarine mortar (144 rounds); 8 × Mk.6 depth charge projectors; 2 × Mk.9 depth charge tracks

USS Levy (DE-162) was a Cannon-class destroyer escort, named in honor of Commodore Uriah P. Levy (1792–1862), a notable figure of the 19th-century Navy.

The ship was laid down on 19 October 1942 by the Federal Shipbuilding and Drydock Company, Newark, New Jersey, launched on 28 March 1943; sponsored by Mrs. Charles Mathoff, niece of Commodore Levy; and commissioned on 13 May 1943.

== Service history ==
After shakedown off Bermuda, Levy, one of the Navy's first destroyer escorts, steamed for the South Pacific, arriving at the Society Islands on 19 August 1943. For the next eight months the ship escorted and screened oilers during various fueling operations in the South and Central Pacific theaters. In support of the Hollandia operation and the strikes against Truk, Statwan, and Ponape from 13 April to 4 May 1944, Levy escorted a convoy of logistic ships to a point north of Manus, arriving on 23 April for a refueling rendezvous with TF 58.

From 12 June to 16 August 1944, Levy screened the oilers which supported the invasion of the Marianas and fueled Admiral Mitscher's carriers during the Battle of the Philippine Sea, in which American carrier-based planes caused significant damage to Japanese naval airpower. For the next four months, she escorted TG 30.8 which refueled and replenished the 3rd Fleet during the conquest of the western Carolines and the liberation of Leyte. On 20 November, while escorting a convoy from Ulithi for another rendezvous with Mitscher's flattops, Levy drove off enemy planes which attacked the formation. She sailed from Eniwetok on 24 November for the west coast and arrived San Diego on 8 December for a month-long overhaul.

Early in March 1945 the ship returned to the Pacific war zones and resumed escort and ASW duty. During the last two months of the war, Levy helped blockade and bombard the remaining Japanese-held atolls in the Marshalls and rescued a boatload of natives who had escaped from enemy-held Jaluit.

August and September marked a high point of the ship's wartime career. Aboard Levy, Capt. H. D. Grow negotiated and accepted the surrender of Mili Atoll on 22 August. A few days later Levy witnessed the surrender of Jaluit Atoll. On 4 September, Wake Island surrendered to Brig. Gen. L. H. M. Sanderson, USMC, embarked in Levy.

Departing the Pacific theater on 17 September, the ship steamed, via San Francisco, for the east coast. On 15 November she joined the St. John's River Group, 16th Fleet, at Green Cove Springs, Florida, and was placed in commission, in reserve. She was decommissioned on 4 April 1947, and berthed at Norfolk, Virginia, as part of the Atlantic Inactive Fleet.

Finally struck from the Navy List on 2 August 1973, the ship was sold for scrap to the Boston Metals Co., Baltimore, Maryland, on 17 July 1974.

== Awards ==
Levy received 5 battle stars for World War II service.
