= Michael F. Farley =

American politician (1863–1921)

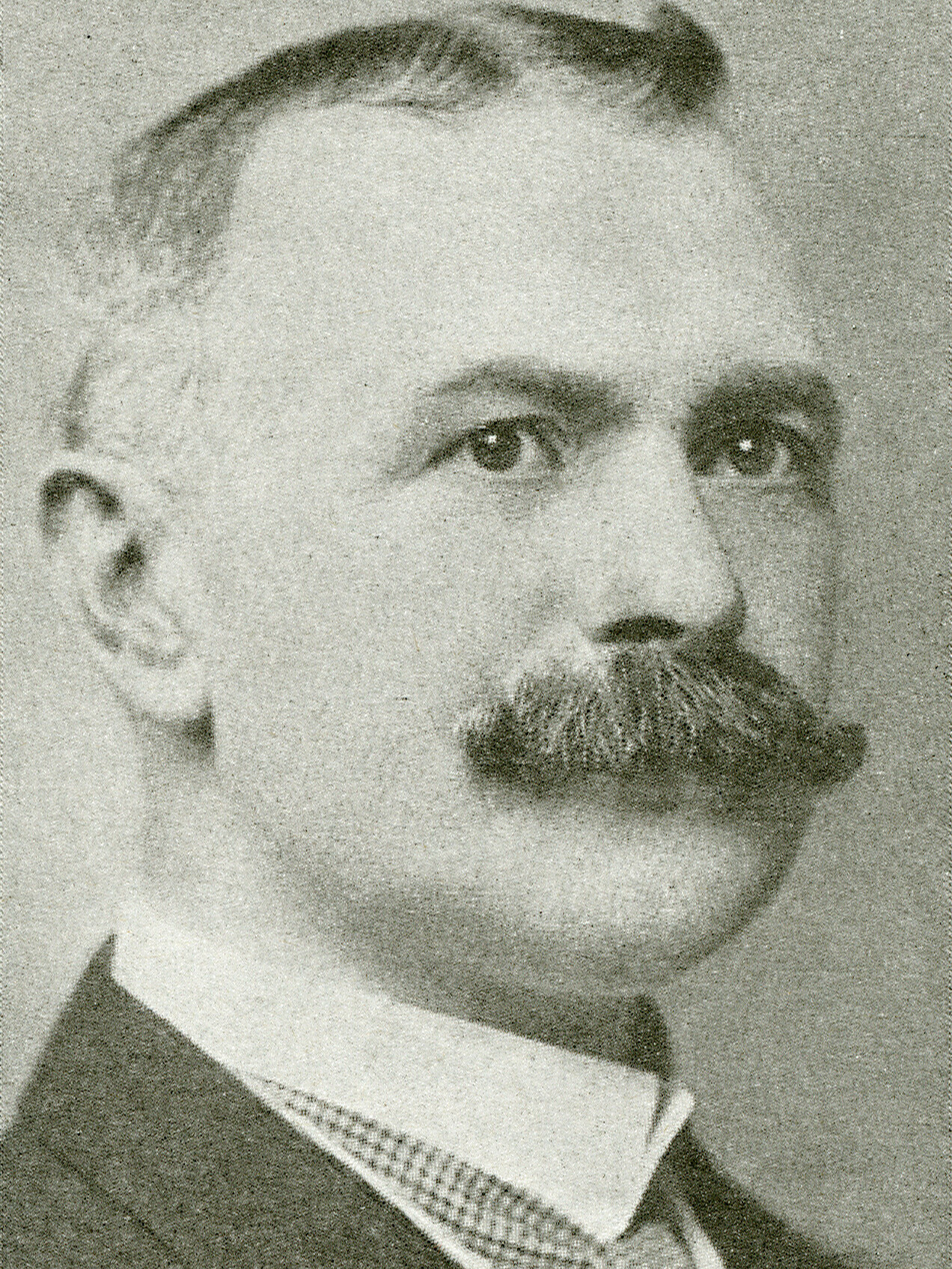

Member of the U.S. House of Representatives from New York's 14th district
- In office March 4, 1915 – March 3, 1917
- Preceded by: Jefferson M. Levy
- Succeeded by: Fiorello LaGuardia

Personal details
- Born: Michael Francis Farley; March 1, 1864 Birr, County Offaly, Ireland
- Died: October 8, 1921 (aged 58) New York City, New York
- Resting place: Calvary Cemetery in Queens, New York
- Party: Democratic

Michael Francis Farley (March 1, 1863 – October 8, 1921) was an Irish-American businessman and politician who served one term as a U.S. representative from New York from 1915 to 1917.

== Early life and career ==
Farley was born in Birr, County of Offaly, Ireland on March 1, 1863. He immigrated to the United States in 1881, and lived in Brooklyn and New York City.

Farley became the owner and operator of a tavern on West 22nd Street in New York City, and was later president of the Wine and Liquor Dealers Association of New York County and Manhattan's Central Association of Liquor Dealers.

== Tenure in Congress ==
He was elected to the 64th United States Congress as a Democrat, and served from March 4, 1915, to March 3, 1917.

=== Gore–McLemore resolution ===
In Congress Farley was a proponent of the 1916 Gore–McLemore resolution. This resolution followed the German Empire's announcement that it would sink armed enemy merchant ships without warning, and was intended to prevent the United States from being drawn into World War I. As introduced, the Gore–McLemore resolution asked American citizens not to travel on the armed vessels of any belligerent, and asked for the Secretary of State to refuse to issue passports to Americans intending to travel on such ships. President Woodrow Wilson opposed the resolution, arguing that travel restrictions were an infringement on the rights of individual Americans. The resolution was tabled by both the House and Senate.

=== Campaign vs. La Guardia ===
Farley was defeated for reelection in 1916 by Fiorello H. La Guardia.

== Death and burial ==
On October 8, 1921, Farley died as the result of exposure to anthrax contracted from his shaving brush. Upon becoming ill he sought treatment at a hospital and received anti-anthrax serum, but the treatment was unsuccessful. His death publicized the fact that New York public health officials had been waging a campaign to prevent the importation of infected hides and animal hair products. These products, including shaving brushes and toothbrushes, caused 11 deaths in the New York area.

Farley was buried in Calvary Cemetery in Queens, New York.

U.S. House of Representatives
Preceded by Jefferson M. Levy	Member of the U.S. House of Representatives from New York's 14th congressional district March 4, 1915 – March 3, 1917	Succeeded by Fiorello H. La Guardia
