= Jonas Phillips Levy =

American merchant and sea captain (1807–1883)

Jonas Phillips Levy (1807–1883) was an American merchant and sea captain. Levy was granted the "freedom of the country" by the government of Peru for signal services rendered in the Peruvian Navy.

== Early life and education ==
Jonas Phillips Levy was born in 1807 in Philadelphia to Michael Levy and Rachel Phillips, a Jewish-American couple. His older brother Uriah Phillips Levy became the first Jewish commodore in the United States Navy.

His maternal grandfather Jonas Phillips immigrated from Germany in the mid-1700s. His great-great-grandfather had come from London and was one of a group of the earliest settlers in Savannah, Georgia. He was a descendant of Sephardic Jews who had fled to Europe and England after the Spanish Inquisition of the early 16th century.

== Marriage and family ==
Jonas Phillips Levy married Frances (Fanny) Mitchell on November 22, 1848. They had five children together: Jefferson Monroe, Louis Napoleon, Mitchell Abraham Cass, Isabella, and Amelia.

Their son Jefferson Monroe became a lawyer and financier in New York, and an admirer of Thomas Jefferson, as his father and uncle Uriah were. In 1879, at the age of 27, Jefferson Monroe financially took control of Thomas Jefferson's home Monticello, which his uncle Uriah Levy had purchased and restored in 1834. Like Uriah, Jefferson Monroe invested his personal funds (in the amount of hundreds of thousands of dollars) to restore and preserve the mansion and 218 acres (88 ha) of grounds. He also purchased 500 acres (200 ha) that originally belonged to the plantation. In 1923, Monticello was purchased by the Thomas Jefferson Foundation to be preserved and operated as a house museum.

== Career ==
Jonas Levy became a merchant and sea captain. He commanded the U.S.S. America during the Mexican–American War (1846–1848), and was assigned to the transportation of troops to Veracruz. When the port surrendered, Levy was appointed its captain by Gen. Winfield Scott.

In addition, he aided the Peruvian Navy, in which he served for some time. The government honored him with "freedom of the country" for his contributions.

In 1852, he became the second and, to date the last, person to be indicted under the Logan Act. Levy, who was living in Mexico at the time, had acquired a grant to build a railway across the Isthmus of Tehuantepec, the narrowest point across Mexico. Secretary of State Daniel Webster had been pressuring Mexico to accept a treaty that would allow a different group of American businessmen to build the railway. Levy wrote a letter to Mexican President Mariano Arista urging him to reject Webster's proposed treaty, prompting Webster to seek an indictment against Levy for violating the Logan Act. Federal prosecutors were forced to dismiss the case after Arista refused to hand over the original copy of the letter, depriving them of the evidence they needed to convict Levy.

Levy was among the founders of the Washington Hebrew Congregation (WHC) in Washington DC and served as its fifth president from 1857 to 1858. Levy and other members of Washington Hebrew Congregation were so well politically connected that they secured from the U.S. Congress an "Act for the Benefit of the Hebrew Congregation in the City of Washington". The act guaranteed for WHC the same rights and immunities accorded to other religious bodies in the District of Columbia. President Franklin Pierce signed the act into law on June 2, 1856, and it is the only Act of Congress that serves as a charter for a Jewish Congregation in the United States.

== See also ==
- Jonas Phillips
