= Jefferson Monroe Levy =

American politician (1852–1924)

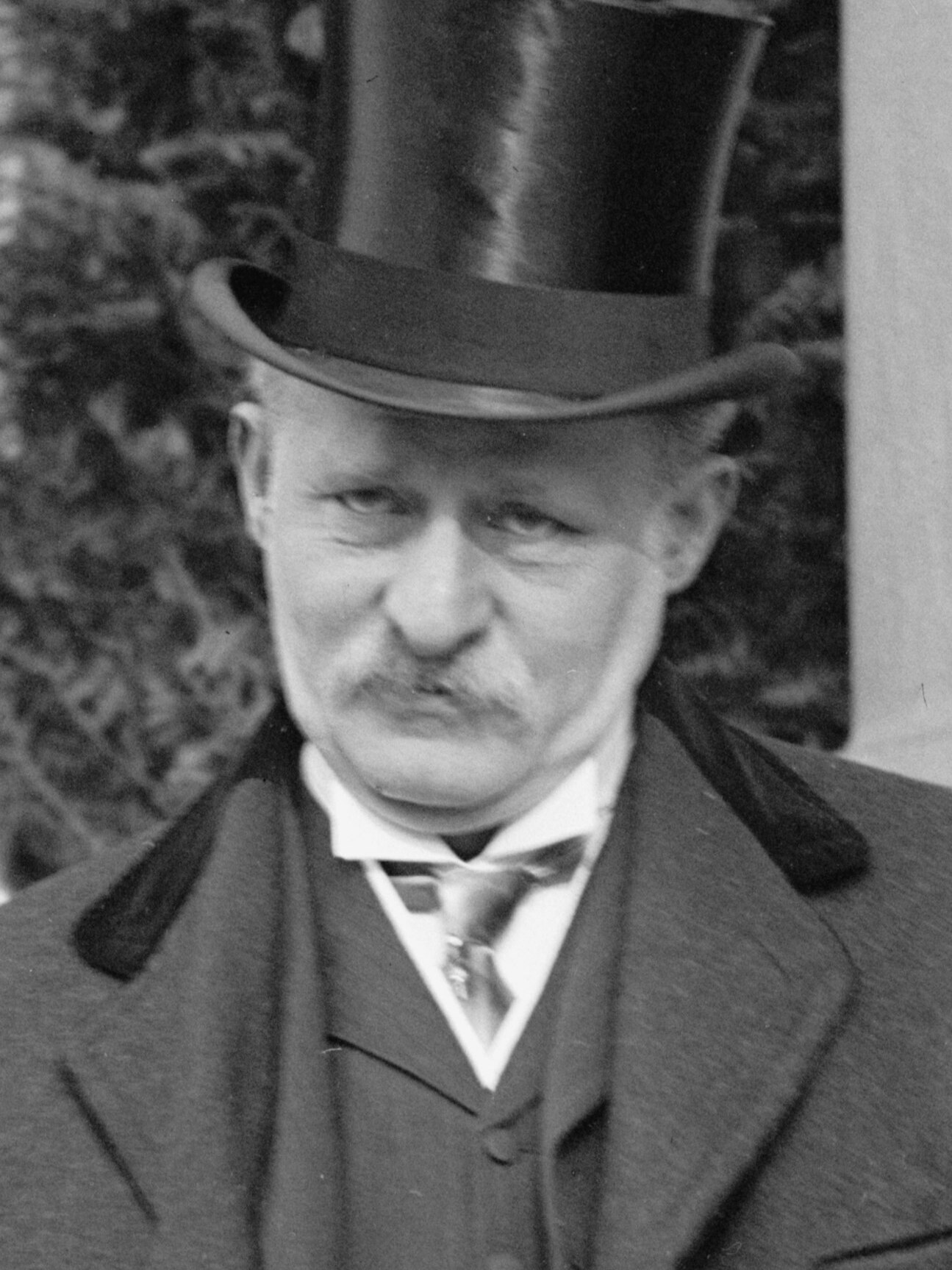
- Levy in 1912

Member of the U.S. House of Representatives from New York
- In office March 4, 1911 – March 3, 1915
- Preceded by: Herbert Parsons
- Succeeded by: Michael F. Farley
- Constituency: 13th district (1911–1913); 14th district (1913–1915)
- In office March 4, 1899 – March 3, 1901
- Preceded by: Richard C. Shannon
- Succeeded by: Oliver H.P. Belmont
- Constituency: 13th district

Personal details
- Born: April 16, 1852 New York City, U.S.
- Died: March 6, 1924 (aged 71) New York City, U.S.
- Party: Democratic
- Education: New York University School of Law
- Occupation: Lawyer; politician

Jefferson Monroe Levy (April 16, 1852 – March 6, 1924) was a three-term U.S. congressman from New York, a leader of the New York Democratic Party, and a renowned real estate and stock speculator.

In 1879 at the age of 27, he took control of Monticello, Thomas Jefferson's home. Levy spent a considerable part of his fortune having Monticello and its grounds restored and preserved.

== Early life and education ==
Born in New York City to Jonas Levy and Frances (Phillips) Levy, an American Jewish couple, Jefferson was one of five children. His father was a merchant and sea captain, and his mother was a descendant of Jonas Phillips and his wife Rebecca Machado. Levy and his siblings attended public and private schools. His mother's parents had immigrated from Germany and London in the mid-18th century, respectively, and his father's Sephardic Jewish ancestors, also from London, were among the first settlers of Savannah, Georgia, in 1733.

Levy graduated from the New York University School of Law in 1873. He was admitted to the bar and practiced in New York City, making money in real estate investment and finance.

== Monticello ==
Jefferson Levy's uncle Uriah P. Levy, the first Jewish commodore (highest rank at the time) of the U.S. Navy, had bought Monticello and some related property in 1834. He had spent much money to restore and preserve the house and grounds, which he used as a summer retreat. During the American Civil War, the Confederacy took control of the property. After the war, the lawyers of Levy's estate regained it for his heirs. In 1879, after buying out the other heirs of his uncle Uriah P. Levy for $10,050 (~$285,958 in 2024), Jefferson Levy took control of Monticello (formerly the plantation of Thomas Jefferson).

When Jefferson Levy took over, the grounds had been reduced to 218 acres. During his tenure, he bought 500 acres to add to the complex. The house and grounds were in severe disrepair due to the overseer Joel Wheeler's lack of care and lengthy lawsuits among the heirs after his uncle's death. Levy spent hundreds of thousands of dollars repairing, restoring, and preserving Monticello, work led by Thomas Rhodes, his on-site superintendent. Levy regularly spent four months a year at the estate and became active in Charlottesville. In 1880 he paid for the restoration of the Town Hall in Charlottesville, originally built as a theater, and named it the Levy Opera House. He allowed visitors to see the house, Monticello, sometimes getting as many as 60 per day.

Beginning about 1909, Maud Littleton, the wife of New York Congressman Martin W. Littleton, started a campaign to have the U.S. Congress buy the mansion and property, and turn it into a government-run monument to Thomas Jefferson. Part of her campaign was heated. Dismayed by newspaper articles that belittled Jefferson Levy's ownership (Levy was also a Congressman from New York at the time), the Albemarle Chapter of the Daughters of the American Revolution (DAR) in November 1912 unanimously adopted the following resolution:

...[The chapter] has noticed with regret various newspaper articles and letters from private persons as to the Government ownership of "Monticello" and reflections upon the Honourable Jefferson M. Levy, the owner of this historic place, and desiring to put on record the Chapter's views as to such ownership and appreciation of Mr. Levy's uniform courtesy and consideration to the Chapter, therefore,

BE IT RESOLVED: That this Chapter is not in sympathy with the methods adopted by which private property of historic interest is proposed to be taken by the strong arm of Government against the will of the individual;

That it bears cheerful testimony to the care with which Monticello is preserved by Mr. Levy and to the zeal which he evinces in the protection of this sacred shrine, it desires to express its belief that no other individual could show more solicitude for the place or more lavishly expend time and money in its preservation. It gladly bears witness to the hospitality which characterizes Mr. Levy and especially the readiness with which he has always met every wish of the Chapter in regard to the place and to say that the way in which the place is opened to the public is worthy of commendation and could not be made more free consistent with the proper care of the property.

In 1915, after Woodrow Wilson was elected to the presidency, the likelihood of Congressional approval seemed high, but authorization was not achieved. In the Post–World War I recession, Levy's fortune declined. In 1923 he agreed to a down payment and mortgage for Monticello's sale to the newly organized Thomas Jefferson Foundation, which raised funds for the purchase and operated it as a house museum.

== Marriage and family ==
Jefferson Levy never married; his mother and a sister acted as hostesses during his stays at Monticello. Levy died in New York City in 1924. He was interred in Beth Olam Cemetery in Brooklyn, which associated with Shearith Israel Congregation, the Spanish and Portuguese Synagogue in Manhattan, near his uncle Uriah Levy.

== Political career ==
Levy was elected as a Democrat to the Fifty-sixth Congress, serving from March 4, 1899, to March 3, 1901. He was not a candidate for renomination in 1900. After this, he resumed law practice in New York City and attended to his real estate and stock investments.

He was later elected to the Sixty-second and Sixty-third Congresses, serving from March 4, 1911, to March 3, 1915. He was not a candidate for renomination in 1914. He resumed the practice of law in New York City.

== Other activities ==
Levy was involved with the American Boy Scouts. He resigned from the board along with William Randolph Hearst over poor fundraising actions in 1910.

In 1894 Levy became a member of the New York State Society of the Sons of the American Revolution. He was assigned national membership number 4539 and state-society number 439.

== Legacy and honors ==
A portrait of Levy was painted by George Burroughs Torrey.

After 1985, when Daniel P. Jordan became president of the Thomas Jefferson Foundation, he arranged to honor the Levy family - uncle and nephew- at Monticello for their roles in preserving the mansion. Jordan had Rachel Levy's gravesite restored, and the Foundation commissioned a monograph that recognized the contributions of the family and was published in 2001.

In 2001, the Thomas Jefferson Foundation published The Levy Family and Monticello, 1834-1923: Saving Thomas Jefferson's House, a history of Jefferson and Uriah Levy's contributions. That same year, Free Press/Simon & Schuster published Marc Leepson's Saving Monticello: The Levy Family's Epic Quest to Rescue the House that Jefferson Built.

== See also ==
- List of Jewish members of the United States Congress

== Sources ==
- United States Congress. "Jefferson Monroe Levy (id: L000268)". Biographical Directory of the United States Congress.
- Marc Leepson, Saving Monticello: The Levy family's Epic Quest to Rescue the House That Jefferson Built, Free Press/Simon & Schuster, 2001; University of Virginia Press, (paperback), 2003, access date, March 1, 2020
- Urofsky, Melvin I. The Levy Family and Monticello, 1834-1923: Saving Thomas Jefferson's House, Monticello: Thomas Jefferson Foundation, 2001

U.S. House of Representatives
Preceded by Richard C. Shannon	Member of the U.S. House of Representatives from New York's 13th congressional district March 4, 1899 – March 3, 1901	Succeeded by Oliver H.P. Belmont
Preceded by Herbert Parsons	Member of the U.S. House of Representatives from New York's 13th congressional district March 4, 1911 – March 3, 1913	Succeeded by Timothy Sullivan
Preceded by John J. Kindred	Member of the U.S. House of Representatives from New York's 14th congressional district March 4, 1913 – March 3, 1915	Succeeded by Michael F. Farley
