= Logan Act =

United States federal law

- Long title: An Act for the punishment of certain Crimes therein specified.
- Enacted by: the 5th United States Congress

Citations
- Statutes at Large: 1 Stat. 613

Codification
- U.S.C. sections created: 18 U.S.C. § 953

Legislative history
- Introduced in the House by Roger Griswold (F–CT) on December 26, 1798; Passed the House on January 17, 1799 (58–36); Passed the Senate on January 25, 1799 (18–2); Signed into law by President John Adams on January 30, 1799

Major amendments
- P.L. 103-322, § 330016(1)(K)

United States Supreme Court cases
- United States v. Curtiss-Wright Export Corp.

The Logan Act (1 Stat. 613, 18 U.S.C. § 953,) is a United States federal law that criminalizes the negotiation of a dispute between the United States and a foreign government by an unauthorized American citizen. It is intended to prevent unauthorized negotiations from undermining the U.S. government's position.

The act was passed following George Logan's unauthorized negotiations with France in 1798; it was signed into law by President John Adams on January 30, 1799. The act was amended in 1994, changing the penalty for violation from "fined $5,000" to "fined under this title"; this appears to be the only amendment to the act. Violation of the Logan Act is a felony, punishable with imprisonment for up to three years.

Only two people have ever been indicted on charges of violating the act, one in 1802 and the other in 1852; neither was convicted.

== History ==
In 1798, amid tensions between the U.S. and France, President Adams sent three envoys to France to negotiate, without success. Dr. George Logan of Pennsylvania, a state legislator and pacifist, subsequently engaged in negotiations with France as a private citizen during the Quasi-War.

The Logan Act was basically a response to an effort by a Philadelphia Quaker named George Logan to try to negotiate directly with the French government. This was a big scandal at the time in foreign affairs because Logan—a Democratic-Republican—was trying to thwart the policy of the Federalists, who controlled both houses of Congress and the White House.

— Steve Vladeck of the University of Texas School of Law

Kevin Kearney, writing in a case comment for the Emory Law Journal, described Dr. Logan's activities in France:

Upon his arrival in Paris, he met with various French officials, including Talleyrand. During these meetings, he identified himself as a private citizen, discussed matters of general interest to the French, and told his audience that anti-French sentiment was prevalent in the United States. Logan's conversation with Merlin de Douai, who occupied the highest political office in the French republic, was typical. Logan stated that he did not intend to explain the American government's position, nor to criticize that of France. Instead, he suggested ways in which France could improve relations with the United States, to the benefit of both countries. He also told Merlin that pro-British propagandists in the United States were portraying the French as corrupt and anxious for war, and were stating that any friend of French principles necessarily was an enemy of the United States. Within days of Logan's last meeting, the French took steps to relieve the tensions between the two nations; they lifted the trade embargo then in place, and released American seamen held captive in French jails. Even so, it seems that Logan's actions were not the primary cause of the Directory's actions; instead, Logan had merely provided convenient timing for the implementation of a decision that had already been made.

Despite the apparent success of Logan's mission, his activities aroused the opposition of the Federalist Party in Congress, who were resentful of the praise showered on Logan by oppositional Democratic-Republican newspapers. Secretary of State Timothy Pickering, also of Pennsylvania, responded by suggesting that Congress "act to curb the temerity and impudence of individuals affecting to interfere in public affairs between France and the United States." The result was that Rep. Roger Griswold introduced the Logan Act. It was pushed through by the Federalist majority in Congress by votes of 58–36 in the House and 18–2 in the Senate. Logan himself could not be punished by the Logan law, since the Constitution does not allow ex post facto, or retroactive laws: that is, laws that punish a person for actions taken before the law was enacted, and that were not illegal at the time they were committed. Rather, the intent was to discourage citizens from conducting foreign policy at cross purposes with the current administration.

Subsequently, Logan himself was appointed and then elected as a Democratic-Republican to the United States Senate from Pennsylvania, and served from July 13, 1801, to March 3, 1807. He was unsuccessful in getting the Logan Act repealed. Despite the Logan Act, he went to England in 1810 on a private diplomatic mission as an emissary of peace in the period before the outbreak of the War of 1812, but was not successful.

During the twentieth and twenty-first centuries with many more private individuals and organizations in contact with foreign governments, there has been discussion about invoking the Logan Act. Nevertheless the Logan Act has not been invoked. No reason has been given but it is possibly because prosecutors have been concerned that speech between a private citizen and a foreign government may still qualify as free speech and be protected in that regard.

== Text ==
§ 953. Private correspondence with foreign governments.

Any citizen of the United States, wherever he may be, who, without authority of the United States, directly or indirectly commences or carries on any correspondence or intercourse with any foreign government or any officer or agent thereof, with intent to influence the measures or conduct of any foreign government or of any officer or agent thereof, in relation to any disputes or controversies with the United States, or to defeat the measures of the United States, shall be fined under this title or imprisoned not more than three years, or both.

This section shall not abridge the right of a citizen to apply himself, or his agent, to any foreign government, or the agents thereof, for redress of any injury which he may have sustained from such government or any of its agents or subjects.

1 Stat. 613, January 30, 1799, codified at 18 U.S.C. § 953 (2004).

== Constitutional authority for foreign relations ==
Article II, Section 2, Clause 2 of the United States Constitution includes the "Treaty Clause," which empowers the President of the United States to propose and chiefly negotiate agreements, which must be confirmed by the Senate, between the United States and other countries, which become treaties between the United States and other countries after the advice and consent of a supermajority of the United States Senate.

[The President] shall have Power, by and with the Advice and Consent of the Senate, to make Treaties, provided two-thirds of the Senators present concur ...

In United States v. Curtiss-Wright Export Corp., 299 U.S. 304 (1936), Justice Sutherland, writing for the Court, observed,

[T]he President alone has the power to speak or listen as a representative of the nation. He makes treaties with the advice and consent of the Senate, but he alone negotiates. Into the field of negotiation, the Senate cannot intrude; and Congress itself is powerless to invade it. As Marshall said in his great argument of March 7, 1800, in the House of Representatives, 'The President is the sole organ of the nation in its external relations, and its sole representative with foreign nations.'

== Alleged violations ==
In general, the Act is intended to prevent unauthorized American citizens from interfering in disputes or controversies between the United States and foreign governments. Although attempts have been made to repeal the Act, it remains law and at least a potential sanction to be used against anyone who without authority interferes in the foreign relations of the United States.

The U.S. government has threatened to use the Act to stop Americans from negotiating with foreign governments. For example, in February 1941 Under Secretary of State Sumner Welles told the press that former President Herbert Hoover might be a target for prosecution because of his negotiations with European nations over sending food relief.

=== 19th century ===
Only two indictments have ever been handed up under the Logan Act, both in the 19th century. The first occurred in 1803 when a grand jury indicted Francis Flournoy, a Kentucky farmer, who had written an article in the Frankfort Guardian of Freedom under the pen name of "A Western American". In the article, Flournoy advocated for the creation of a new independent state, not part of the US, in North America that would ally with France. The United States Attorney for Kentucky, an Adams appointee and brother-in-law of Chief Justice John Marshall, went no further than procuring the indictment of Flournoy, and there was no further prosecution of him. The purchase of the Louisiana Territory later that year appeared to cause the separatism issue to become moot, and the case was abandoned.

In 1852, Jonas Phillips Levy became the second, and to date the last, person to be indicted under the Logan Act. Levy, an American merchant and sailor who was living in Mexico at the time, had acquired a grant to build a railway across the Isthmus of Tehuantepec, the narrowest point across Mexico. Secretary of State Daniel Webster had been pressuring Mexico to accept a treaty that would allow a different group of American businessmen to build the railway. Levy wrote a letter to Mexican President Mariano Arista urging him to reject Webster's proposed treaty, prompting Webster to seek an indictment against Levy for violating the Logan Act. Federal prosecutors were forced to dismiss the case after Arista refused to hand over the original copy of the letter, depriving them of the evidence they needed to convict Levy.

=== 20th century ===
In 1975, Senators John Sparkman and George McGovern traveled to Cuba and met with officials there. In considering that case, the U.S. Department of State concluded:

The clear intent of this provision [Logan Act] is to prohibit unauthorized persons from intervening in disputes between the United States and foreign governments. Nothing in section 953 [Logan Act], however, would appear to restrict members of the Congress from engaging in discussions with foreign officials in pursuance of their legislative duties under the Constitution. In the case of Senators McGovern and Sparkman the executive branch, although it did not in any way encourage the Senators to go to Cuba, was fully informed of the nature and purpose of their visit, and had validated their passports for travel to that country.

Senator McGovern's report of his discussions with Cuban officials states: "I made it clear that I had no authority to negotiate on behalf of the United States—that I had come to listen and learn ..." (Cuban Realities: May 1975, 94th Cong., 1st Sess., August 1975). Senator Sparkman's contacts with Cuban officials were conducted on a similar basis. The specific issues raised by the Senators (e.g., the Southern Airways case; Luis Tiant's desire to have his parents visit the United States) would, in any event, appear to fall within the second paragraph of Section 953.

Accordingly, the Department does not consider the activities of Senators Sparkman and McGovern to be inconsistent with the stipulations of Section 953.

=== 21st century ===
In June 2007, Representative Steve King introduced legislation that would prohibit Speaker of the House Nancy Pelosi from using federal funds to travel to foreign states deemed sponsors of terrorism by the U.S.; the amendment was not adopted.

In March 2015, 47 Republican senators released an open letter to the Iranian government regarding President Barack Obama's attempts to broker a nuclear arms agreement between Iran and six major power (P5+1). The letter warned Iran of the limitations of President Obama's term in office and constitutional powers and notes that anything done without the advice and consent of the Senate could be undone by the next president. A petition on the White House's We The People website requesting that the Obama administration prosecute the 47 senators under the Logan Act accumulated signatures from over 320,200 people.

In April 2018, former Secretary of State John Kerry met with the Iranian Foreign Minister in order to ensure the Iran nuclear deal framework remained more or less intact. Matthew Summers, a spokesman for Kerry, admitted that Kerry "urged Iran to keep its commitments under the Iran nuclear agreement". Stephen Vladeck, law professor at the University of Texas, did not agree that Kerry would be in violation of the act as his intent was to preserve the US policy then in place, rather than seeking to destroy it. Vladeck has also said of the Act: "It raises serious constitutional questions that I think would dissuade even the most zealous prosecutor from trying a case under the Logan Act.”

Former U.S. Attorney for the Southern District of New York (SDNY) Geoffrey Berman stated that he was pressured by the Justice Department to indict Kerry for violating the Logan Act. The SDNY office informed the Department of Justice that it would not prosecute. Berman stated the Justice Department then sent the case to the office of the United States Attorney for the District of Maryland, which also declined to prosecute Kerry.

In August 2024, former President Donald Trump was reported to have contacted Israeli Prime Minister Benjamin Netanyahu urging him to reject any ceasefire deal, fearing a ceasefire would help Vice President Kamala Harris in the upcoming election. This was reported by Judy Woodruff during a live broadcast by PBS during the Democratic National Convention. The next day, Woodruff issued a statement apologizing for the comments, saying, "I want to clarify my remarks on the PBS News special on Monday night about the ongoing cease fire talks in the Middle East. As I said, this was not based on my original reporting; I was referring to reports I had read, in Axios and Reuters, about former President Trump having spoken to the Israeli Prime Minister. In the live TV moment, I repeated the story because I hadn't seen later reporting that both sides denied it. This was a mistake and I apologize for it." The Axios article carried by Reuters had stated that "One source told Axios Trump's call was intended to encourage Netanyahu to take the deal, but stressed he did not know if this is indeed what the former president told Netanyahu", with no mention of Trump urging him to reject any ceasefire deal. This story was published on August 14, 2024, and the following day, Axios published a follow-up story stating that Israeli Prime Minister Benjamin Netanyahu's office had released a statement saying that Netanyahu did not speak with former President Donald Trump to discuss the Gaza hostage and ceasefire deal.

== Constitutionality ==
There has been little judicial discussion of the constitutionality of the Logan Act. The U.S. District Court for the Southern District of New York in Waldron v. British Petroleum Co., 231 F. Supp. 72 (S.D.N.Y. 1964), mentioned in passing that the Act was likely unconstitutional due to the vagueness of the terms "defeat" and "measures", but did not rule on the question. In December 2020, the Department of Justice's Office of Legal Counsel wrote a memorandum opinion concluding that the Logan Act "was constitutional when enacted, and unless or until repealed by Congress, remains valid and enforceable." The Department of Justice made this opinion public in January 2025.

== Relationship between FISA and Logan Act ==
Analysis of the Michael Flynn case by Peter Strzok indicate that then-Vice President Joe Biden encouraged the use of the Logan Act to evoke a FISA investigation.

A second important notation by Strzok reads "VP: Logan Act", suggesting that Biden raised the idea of using the Logan Act, which forbids unauthorized citizens from negotiating with a foreign government.

== See also ==
- Alien and Sedition Acts
- Espionage Act
- 1980 October Surprise theory
