= Aloha Jewish Chapel =

Jewish chapel on Pearl Harbor in Honolulu, Hawaii

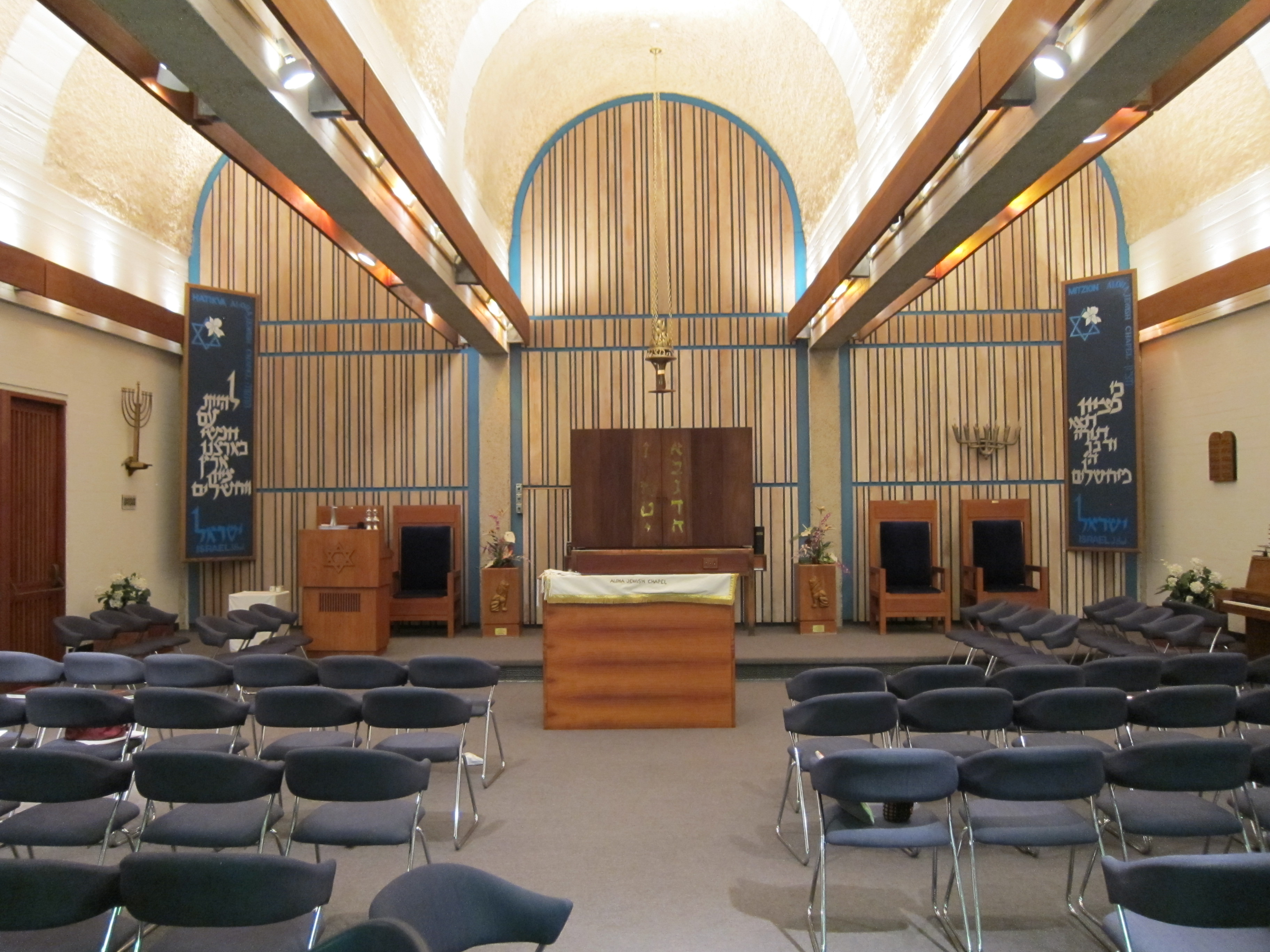
- Interior of Aloha Jewish Chapel

- Location in Hawaii

Religion
- Affiliation: Judaism
- Rite: Unaffiliated
- Ecclesiastical or organisational status: Synagogue
- Status: Active

Location
- Location: Pearl Harbor Naval Station (Makalapa Gate), Honolulu, Hawaii
- Country: United States
- Coordinates: 21°21′11″N 157°56′10″W

Architecture
- Architect: Vladimir Ossipoff
- Type: Synagogue
- Established: 1975

Aloha Jewish Chapel is an unaffiliated Jewish synagogue located on the grounds of what is now Joint Base Pearl Harbor–Hickam in Honolulu, Hawaii, in the United States. Dedicated in 1975, it serves Jewish military personnel, their families and civilian employees stationed in Hawaii. It was the first Jewish chapel built on a United States military installation and provides facilities for religious services, celebrations and community activities.

== History ==
Completed in 1975, the building was designed by Vladimir Ossipoff as the first building built by the United States government exclusively for Jewish worship. (The Commodore Levy Chapel, Naval Station Norfolk, is the Navy's oldest Jewish Chapel, but it is part of a larger Chapel complex.) The Aloha Jewish Chapel was dedicated on December 14, 1975 by Rear Admiral Bertram Wallace Korn, who was, at the time, the highest ranking rabbi in the United States military.

The chapel has a vaulted roof with an adjacent mikveh (ritual bath). The building also contains a kitchen for kosher food, a library, and a small social hall. On the exterior of the building is the "Shalom" sculpture created in 1975 by Selma Mannheim of Los Angeles, California. With its copious natural light, the building is considered a prime example of Hawaii Modern architecture.

The congregation raised money for, and purchased, a new Torah scroll, which was dedicated on October 26, 2008. This was the first dedication of a new Torah scroll in Hawaii. Before the chapel was built, the congregation worshipped in Quonset huts at Pearl Harbor and moved into the new building in 1975. A Jewish chaplain was already posted to Hawaii by the time of the 1941 attack, when Navy Chaplain H. Cerf Straus was present. The scroll cost $US$45,000, paid for by donations from Jewish and non-Jewish military personnel and civilians, and was written for military families stationed in Hawaii.

== Gallery ==
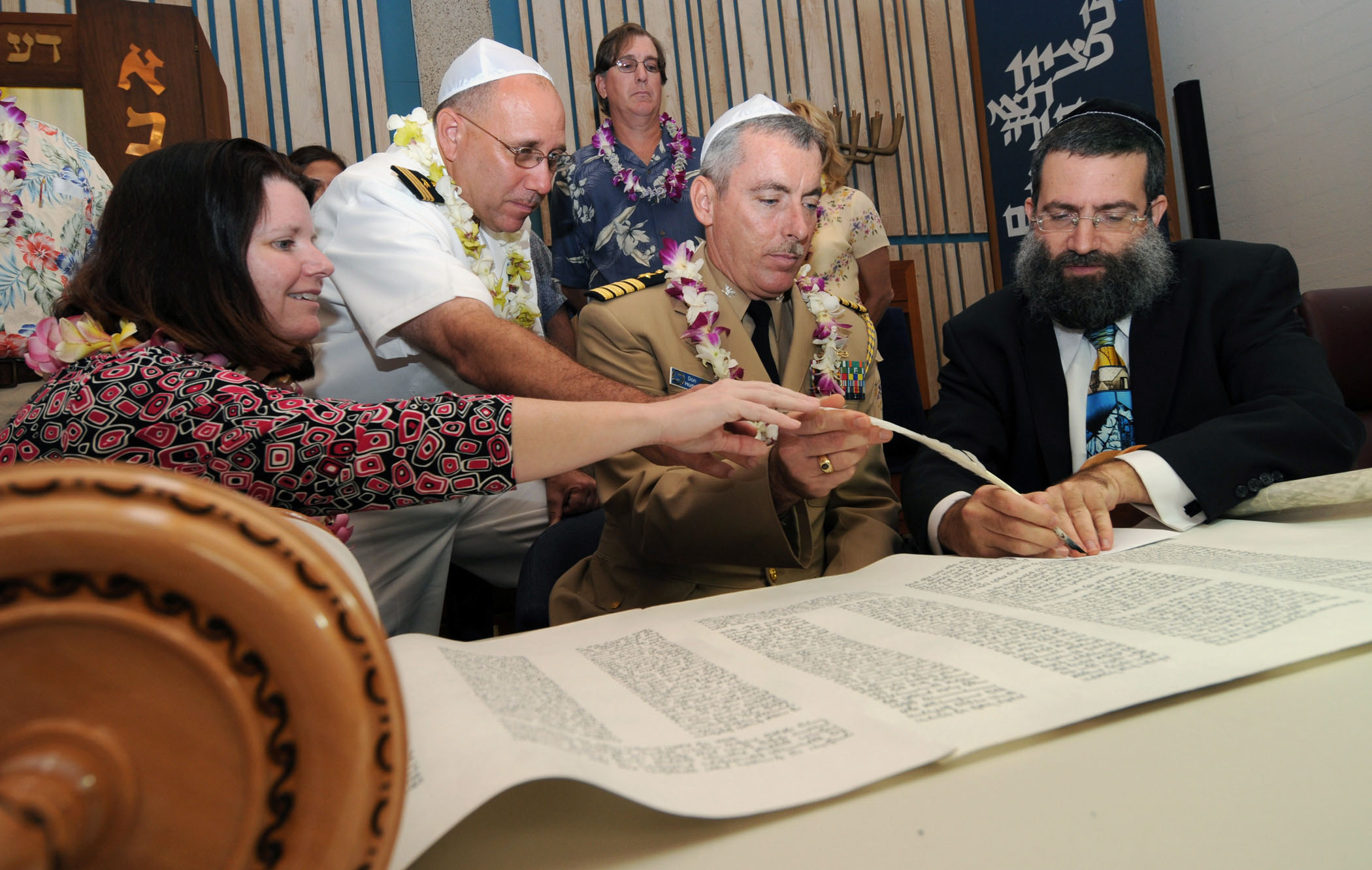
Sefer Torah dedication in 2008
