= Jonas Phillips =

American merchant (1736–1803)

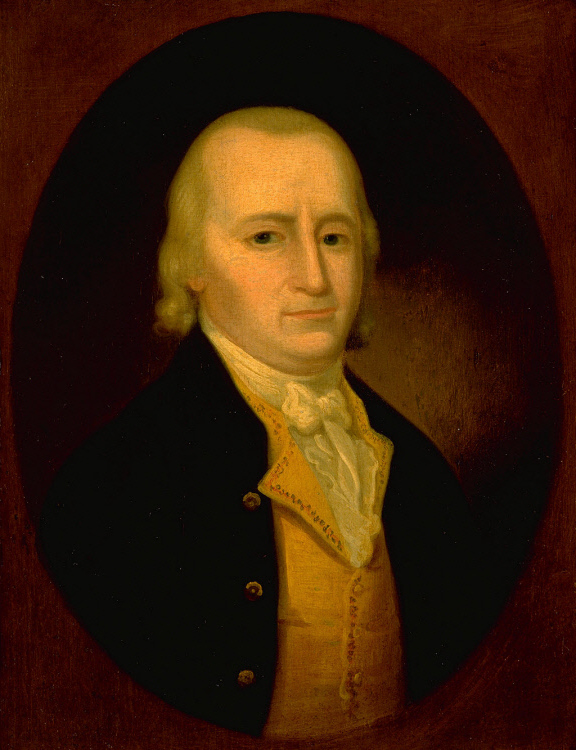
- Born: 1736
- Died: January 29, 1803

Jonas Phillips (1736—1803) was a veteran of the American Revolutionary War and an American merchant in New York City and Philadelphia, Pennsylvania. He was the immigrant ancestor of the Jewish Phillips family in the United States. Emigrating from Germany in 1759, Phillips worked off his passage as an indentured servant in Charleston, South Carolina. He moved to the North in 1759, becoming a merchant in New York City and then moving to Philadelphia, Pennsylvania.

A founder of Mikveh Israel in Philadelphia during the war, Phillips and his wife had a total of twenty-one children. One of their great-grandsons was Franklin J. Moses, Jr., who was elected governor of South Carolina in 1872 during the Reconstruction era; his father Franklin J. Moses, Sr. was Chief Justice of the state supreme court. Another notable grandson was Uriah Phillips Levy, the first Jewish Commodore in the United States Navy. An additional grandson was Mordechai Manuel Noah, American consul to Tunis and recognized as the most influential Jew in the early 19th-century United States.

== Childhood and emigration ==
Jonas Phillips was born in 1736 to an Ashkenazi Jewish family in Germany, in either Buseck or Frankfort am Main (Frankfurt). He was the son of Aaron Phillips, who had anglicized his name, and his wife. Phillips grew up speaking Yiddish and later learned English.

At the age of 20, the ambitious Phillips emigrated to the British colonies in North America, sailing from London in November 1756. Working as an indentured servant to pay off his passage, he lived in Charleston, South Carolina. He was employed by Moses Lindo, an indigo planter and Sephardic Jew who was part of the growing Jewish community in the city. By the beginning of the 19th century, Charleston was home to the largest and wealthiest Jewish community in North America, a status it would hold until about 1830.

In 1759, Jonas Phillips completed his indenture and became a "freeman." He left the South, moving first to Albany, New York, the state capital. He soon moved to New York City, where he became a merchant. By 1760, Phillips had joined a lodge of Freemasons in New York. Phillips left Albany to secure an introduction to Rebecca Mendez Machado, daughter of a Sephardic Jewish family in New York City. They married and eventually had 21 children together.

== American Revolutionary War ==
Phillips was attracted to the ideals that led to the American Revolutionary War. In 1770 he strongly supported the Non-Importation Agreement, and favored the Patriot cause at the outbreak of war. In 1776 he used his influence in his Jewish congregation to close the synagogue and leave New York, rather than continue under British rule. The building was abandoned.

Together with the majority of the congregation, Phillips and his family moved to Philadelphia, where he continued in business until 1778. In that year he joined the revolutionary Continental Army, serving in the Philadelphia Militia under Colonel Bradford.

=== Yiddish code ===
On July 28, 1776, Phillips wrote in Yiddish to a relative and business correspondent, Gumpel Samson of the Netherlands. He discussed the conflict with Great Britain and said the Americans (Patriots) had 100,000 soldiers compared to the 25,000 of the British. He included an appendix of items he wanted to import for sale in America. Thrilled with the Revolution, Phillips enclosed a copy of the Declaration of Independence. Phillips' use of Yiddish prevented most British from being able to read the letter (although they also had German Jewish immigrants in their culture). The British who intercepted the letter did not recognize the language and thought the letter was in code. Research in the 2020s indicates that a Dunlap Broadside discovered in the The National Archives at Kew in 2009 is the very copy that Phillips shipped out.

== Civil rights for Jews ==
In a petition dated September 7, 1787, Phillips addressed the Constitutional Convention, which was meeting in Philadelphia. To support religious freedom, he asked them to avoid making a Christian religious test in the constitution for Federal office holders.

== Other Jewish activities ==
Phillips was one of the founder members of Congregation Mikveh Israel in Philadelphia. When its synagogue on Pine Street was consecrated in 1782, he was serving as president of the congregation. After the Revolution, he and his family moved to New York for a time, but soon after returned to Philadelphia. Phillips continued to reside there until his death. While the congregation left that first synagogue and the property was redeveloped, its cemetery at the site has been preserved and is designated as a National Historic Landmark.

== Death and burial ==
Phillips died at Philadelphia, on January 29, 1803. His remains were interred at New York in the cemetery on New Bowery of Congregation Shearith Israel. His widow Rebecca Machado Phillips lived until 1831.

== Legacy ==
Phillips and Rebecca had 21 children together. Their descendants became educated and continued to contribute to the United States. One of their great-grandsons was Franklin J. Moses, Jr., who was elected as governor of South Carolina in 1872. His father, Franklin J. Moses, Sr. was elected as Chief Justice of the state supreme court in 1868. Another grandson was Uriah Phillips Levy, the first Jewish Commodore in the United States Navy. In 1834, he bought Monticello eight years after President Thomas Jefferson's death, and used his own money to preserve the house and estate for the American people. An additional descendant was Mordechai Manuel Noah, American Consul to the Kingdom of Tunis.

== See also ==
- Jonas Phillips Levy
