= Commodore Levy Chapel =

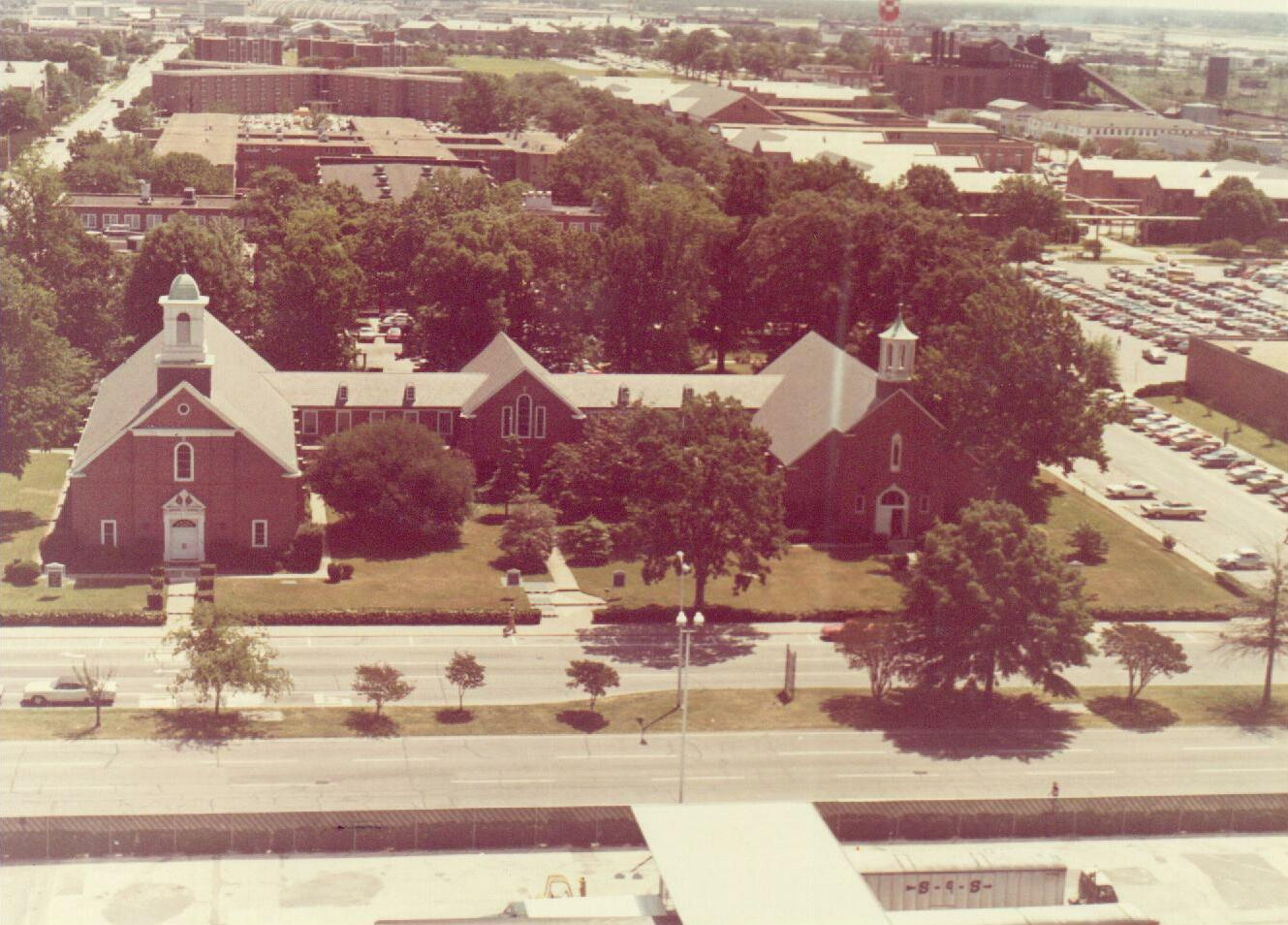
- Frazier Hall, the Chapel complex, Naval Station Norfolk. The Commodore Levy Chapel (CLC) is on the second floor over the main entrance. The outline of the 3 stained glass windows along the back wall of the CLC can be seen in this photograph

- Location in Virginia

Religion
- Affiliation: Judaism
- Rite: Unaffiliated
- Ecclesiastical or organizational status: Synagogue and chapel
- Status: Active

Location
- Location: Naval Station Norfolk, Norfolk, Virginia
- Interactive map of Commodore Levy Chapel
- Coordinates: 36°56′48″N 76°19′07″W

Architecture
- Established: 1942 (as a congregation)
- Completed: 1942

The Commodore Levy Chapel is an unaffiliated Jewish synagogue and chapel, located at Naval Station Norfolk, in Norfolk, Virginia, in the United States. Established in 1942 and renamed in 1959 in honor of Uriah P. Levy, the synagogue and chapel are the oldest Jewish chapel in the United States Navy. The synagogue and chapel are part of a chapel complex in the Naval Station's Frazier Hall that also includes Catholic, Protestant, and Muslim places of worship.

The Commodore Levy Chapel is one of two Navy chapels named in honor of the same person, the other being the Commodore Uriah P. Levy Center and Chapel, at the United States Naval Academy in Annapolis, Maryland.

== History ==
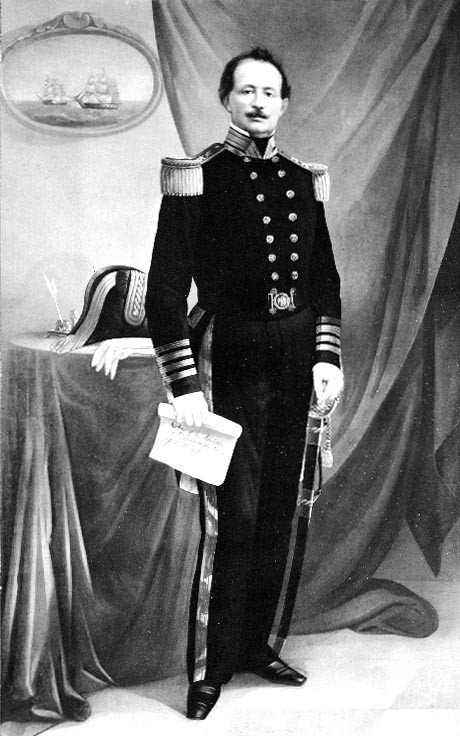
Commodore Uriah P. Levy

Although not renamed until 1959 for Levy, the chapel was created in 1942 during World War II (in a space formerly used as a chapel complex auditorium) as the Navy's first chapel dedicated to worship and religious events for Jewish military personnel and their families. Therefore, although it is recognized as the Navy's oldest land-based Jewish Chapel, the first Navy Jewish Chapel created as a free-standing building from the ground up is the Aloha Jewish Chapel, Naval Station Pearl Harbor, in Hawaii.

The Protestant and Catholic chapels in the Frazier Hall (then part of Naval Operating Base Norfolk—NOB Norfolk) were opened two weeks after the December 7, 1941, attack on Pearl Harbor, and they were officially named and dedicated on February 21, 1942.

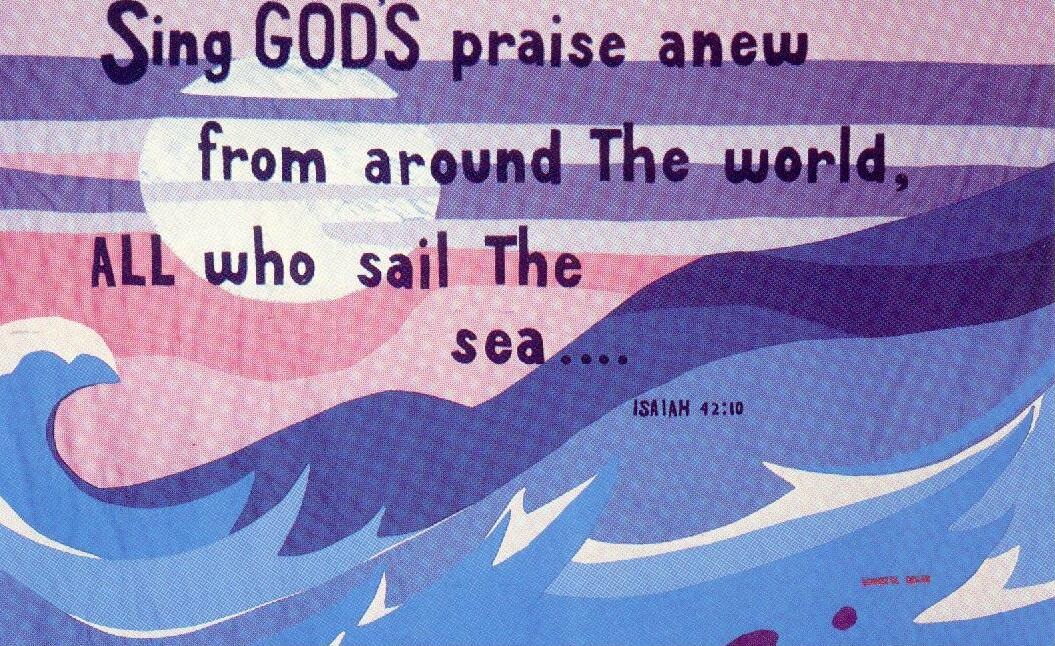
Chapel 7'x11' cloth-on-cloth wall-hanging, designed by Norfolk artist Leonette Adler, and dedicated as part of a community-wide "Jewish Pride in the Navy Day" celebration, September 12, 1982.

Jewish chaplain Selwyn Ruslander was assigned to Norfolk August 1942, and began conducting Jewish services in Frazier Hall, in the second floor auditorium area. That area was formally dedicated as a Jewish chapel the following year, during a conference of Jewish chaplains February 20–21, 1943. Present at the dedication was the Navy Chief of Chaplains, Chaplain Robert D. Workman; the senior chaplain for the Norfolk Operating Base and Officer-in-Charge of the Navy's Chaplain School, Cinton A. Neyman; and "other dignitaries." The Jewish community of Norfolk presented a Torah ark, constructed by Lester Sherrick, a civilian member of the community, as part of the dedication ceremony.

When Rabbi Julius Nodel was assigned to the NOB in the mid-40s, he not only led services in the Levy Chapel, but also led services for Jewish personnel at other bases, including two in North Carolina: the Patrol Plane Base and Coast Guard Air Station, Elizabeth City, N.C., and the Naval Air Station, Weeksville, N.C.

In 1959, in honor of Levy's "dedication to his religion and his country," the chapel was renamed the "Commodore Levy Chapel." Credit for the choice of the name belongs to history-minded Lieutenant Commander William J. Jasper, DC USN, who suggested it to the Jewish Chaplain Samuel Sobel, CHC, USN. Jasper was the driving force behind the establishment of the Levy Chapel as the first permanent Jewish chapel in the Navy.

On December 13, 2009, special ceremonies were conducted to "rededicate" the chapel on the occasion of its 50th anniversary. The ceremony honored the memory of Rabbi Samuel Sobel, the only Navy Jewish Chaplain who served twice at the Levy Chapel. Sobel was the author of Intrepid Sailor, a biography of Uriah P. Levy, published in 1980. The keynote speaker was Rabbi Jonathan Panitz, who, while on active duty as a Jewish chaplain at the Naval Academy, was part of the original effort to raise funds in order to establish the academy's Jewish chapel, also named for Levy.

== Special events ==
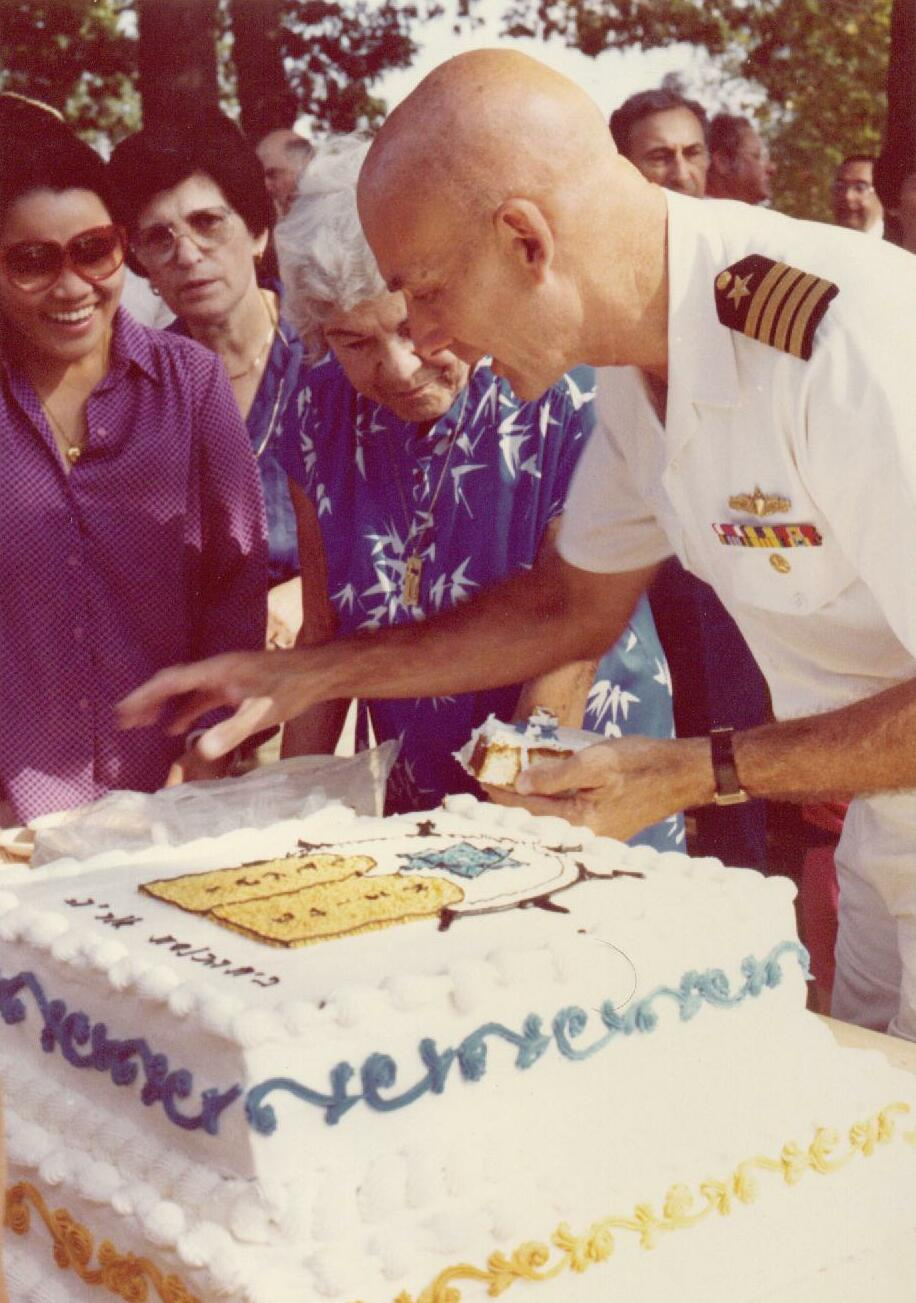
Navy Captain Louis Colbus, then Chief of Staff, Commander Carrier Group EIGHT, takes the first piece of cake during "Jewish Pride in the Navy Day," a special Chapel celebration, September 12, 1982. The CLC symbol, "the Mariner's Tablets" – the Jewish chaplain insignia with the upper portion surrounded by a ship's wheel – can be seen as the cake design

Over the years, the chapel has been the site of many special programs and events. In 1980, Jewish chaplain Arnold Resnicoff initiated a quarterly "Commodore Levy Sabbath" program. Because many military personnel participated in civilian synagogue services and programs closer to the areas in which they lived, this new program encouraged them to attend services at the Levy Chapel every three months, to have "the opportunity to renew acquaintances, and to allow the area 'old timers' to meet new arrivals."

That same year, a "blue ribbon panel" composed of Navy Jewish chaplains met at Frazier Hall to consider the "beneficial suggestion" made to the Navy to change the Jewish chaplain uniform insignia. The insignia, the two tablets of the ten commandments, topped by a six-pointed Star of David, had included Roman numerals to represent the ten commandments—but the recommendation was to replace those numerals with the first ten letters of the Hebrew alphabet. Based on the unanimous recommendation of the panel, the change was made in 1981.

On September 12, 1982, the chapel sponsored a "Jewish Pride in the Navy Day," that included the dedication of an 11 by 7 foot cloth-on-cloth wall hanging for the chapel, designed by local Norfolk artist Leonette Adler, and cut and sewn by Jewish officers, sailors, and their spouses. The celebration included music on the Frazier Hall lawn by members of the Navy band, and tours of local Navy ships. As described by the Navy News, "the hanging features a backdrop of silver moon and roaring waves of blue and white and words from the prophet Isaiah."

== Chapel complex ==
In addition to the Protestant and Catholic chapels that predate the Commodore Levy Chapel in the Frazier Hall chapel complex, a Muslim mosque/chapel was dedicated in November 1997.

== Gallery ==
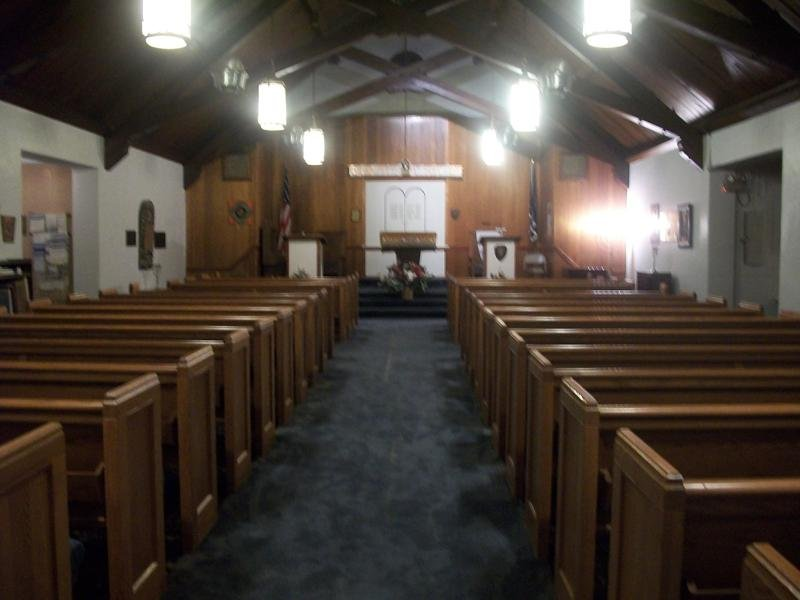
Chapel interior, facing Torah ark

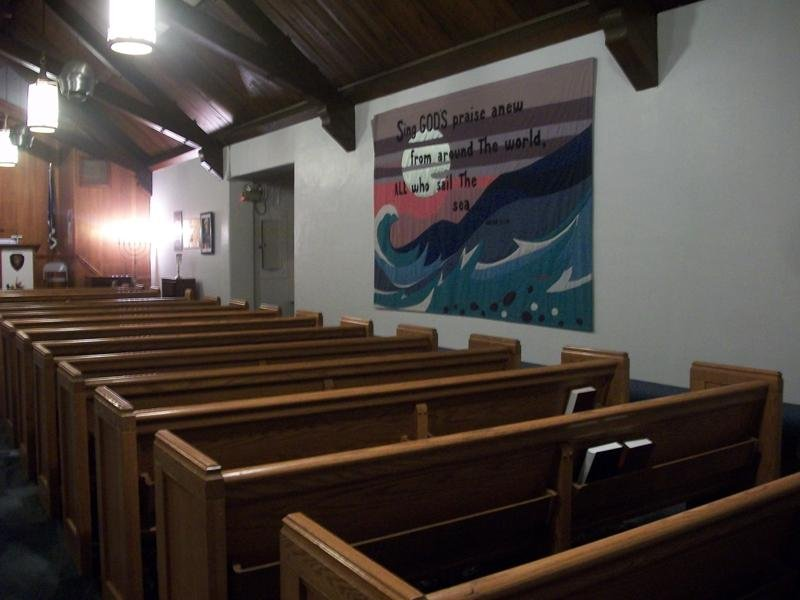
Chapel interior, showing wall-hanging

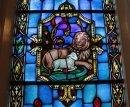
Small stained glass window, showing lion lying down with lamb

== See also ==
- United States military chaplain symbols
- United States military chaplains
