= Naval Academy Jewish Chapel =

Jewish naval chapel in Maryland, United States

Commodore Uriah P. Levy Center and Jewish Chapel
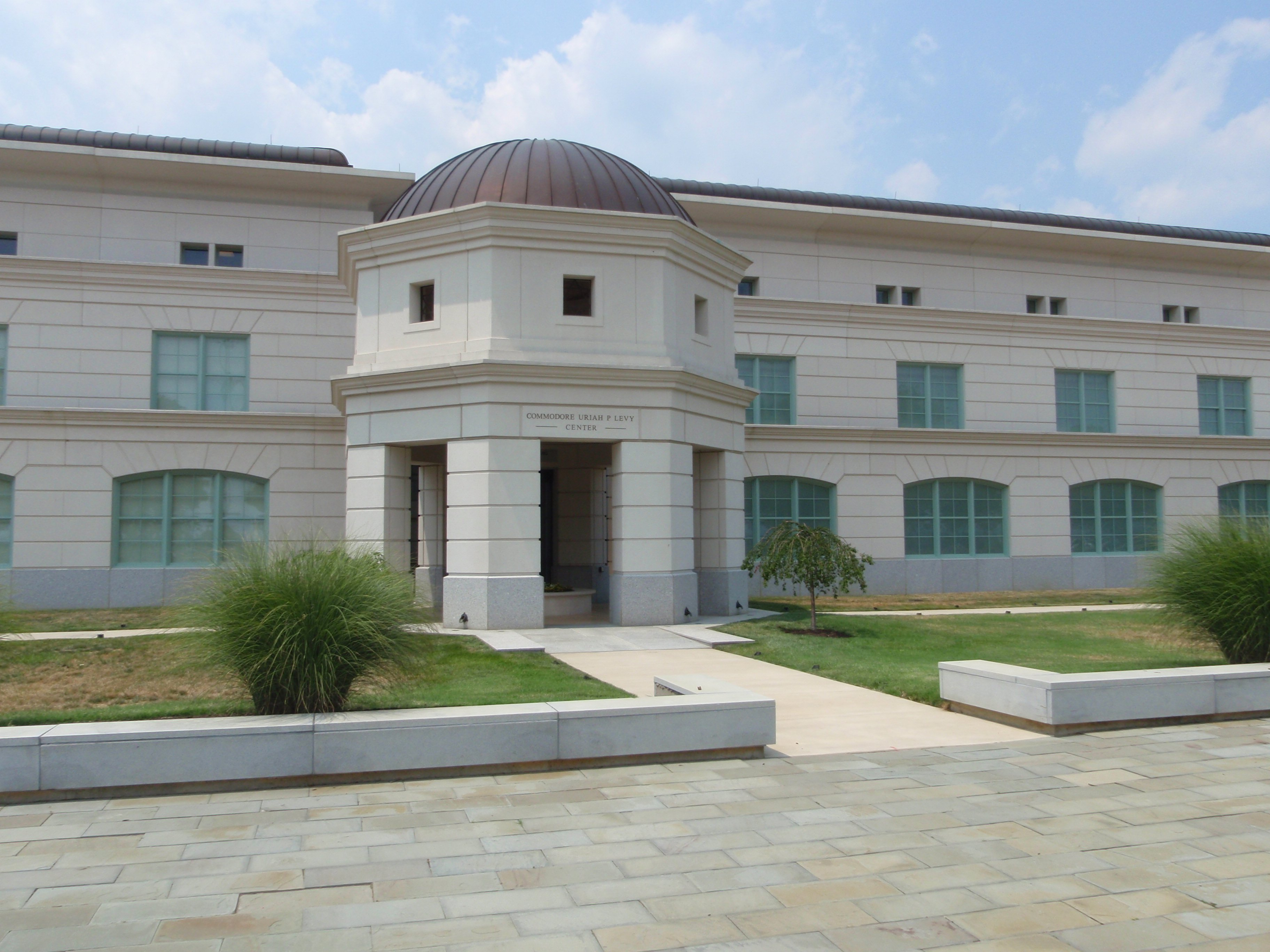
- The chapel exterior in 2010

- Location within Maryland

Religion
- Affiliation: Judaism
- Ecclesiastical or organizational status: Synagogue
- Status: Active

Location
- Location: Annapolis, Maryland
- Country: United States
- Interactive map of Commodore Uriah P. Levy Center and Jewish Chapel
- Coordinates: 38°58′49″N 76°28′52″W

Architecture
- Architect: Joseph Boggs
- General contractor: The Whiting-Turner Contracting Company
- Groundbreaking: November 2, 2003
- Completed: 2005
- Construction cost: $8 million

Specifications
- Interior area: 35,000 square feet (3,300 m^{2})
- Materials: Jerusalem stone

Website
- usna.edu/chapel/faithcommunity/jewishcommunities.php

Commodore Uriah P. Levy Center and Jewish Chapel is the Jewish chapel at the United States Naval Academy, in Annapolis, Maryland.

The center is named in honor of Commodore Uriah P. Levy (1792–1862), the first Jewish commodore in the United States Navy, who is famous for refusing to flog his sailors. The Levy Center is adjacent to Mitscher Hall and contains a 410-seat synagogue, a fellowship hall, a Character Learning Center, classrooms, and offices for the Brigade's social director, the academic board, and the academy's Honor Board.

Before the chapel was completed in 2005, Jewish midshipmen attended Congregation Knesset Israel in downtown Annapolis, or held services in the interfaith chapel at Mitscher Hall.

== History ==
The groundbreaking ceremony was held on November 2, 2003, and the building was dedicated in September 2005.

The Levy Center cost $8 million to design, build and furnish; of which approximately $1.8 million was paid for with military construction funds, and the remaining amount was paid for by donations raised by the Friend of the Jewish Chapel, a campaign headed by Jewish alumni of the academy and others.

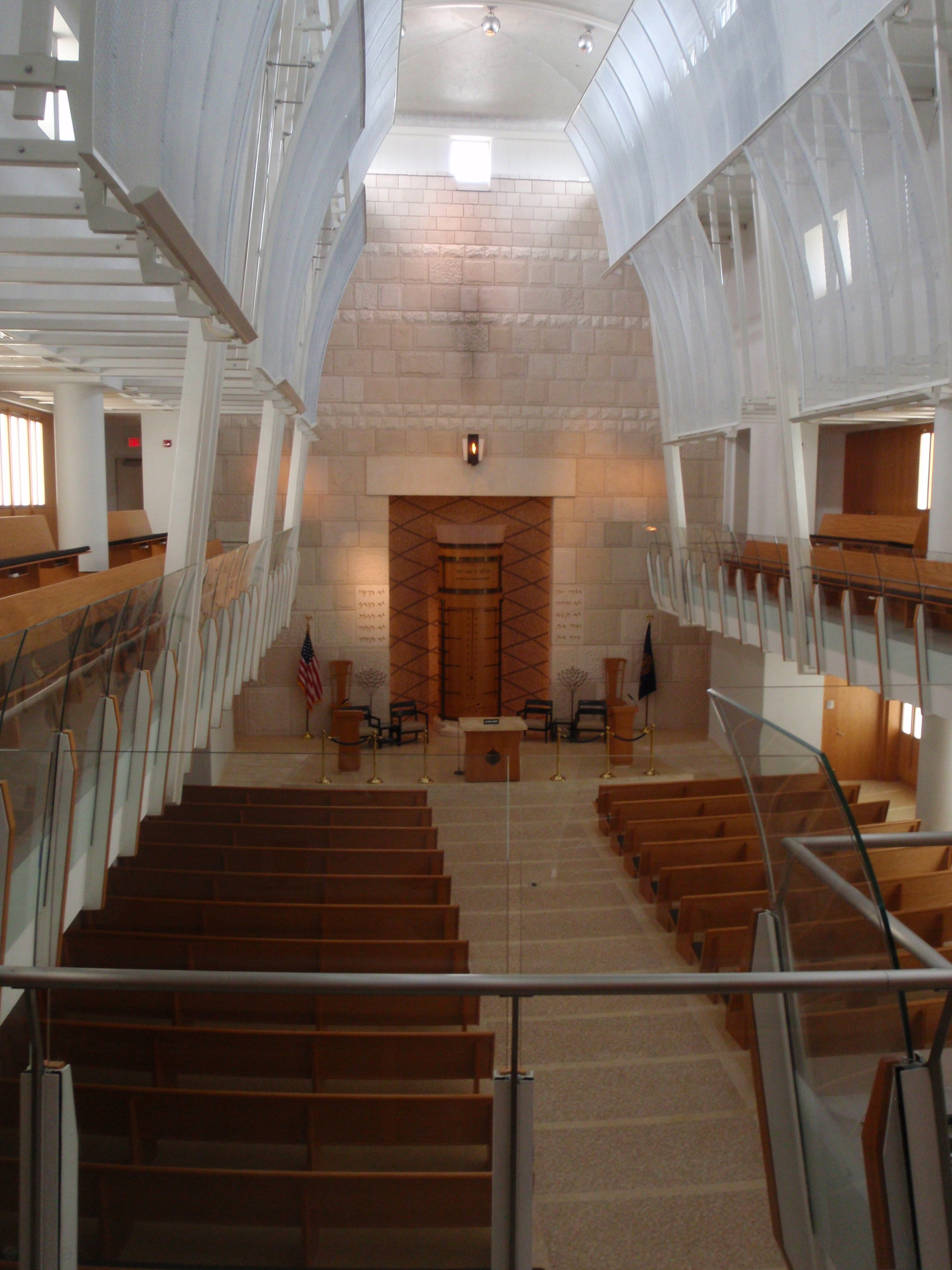
Naval Academy Jewish Chapel

== Architecture ==
The 35,000-square-foot (3,300 m^{2}) building was designed by Maryland architect Joseph Boggs and was built by The Whiting-Turner Contracting Company. The entrance pavilion has elements related to the center bay of Thomas Jefferson's Monticello. Levy purchased Monticello in 1834 and restored it because of his admiration for Jefferson, who died in 1826. The chapel includes a nearly 45-foot (14 m) high wall that is a replica of the Western Wall in Jerusalem. The wall is made of Jerusalem stone. The roof of the building is constructed of copper. The architecture of the exterior is consistent with nearby Bancroft Hall.

The chapel was awarded the Maryland AIA Honor Awards 2006, Public Building of the Year; Institutional.

== See also ==
- Aloha Jewish Chapel
- History of the Jews in Maryland
- Jewish American military history
- Jewish War Veterans
- National Museum of American Jewish Military History
- Naval Academy Chapel
- United States Navy Chaplain Corps
- United States Air Force Academy Cadet Chapel (including Jewish chapel)
- United States Military Academy Chapel
- West Point Jewish Chapel
