= Safety cabinet =

Cabinet used to store flammable chemical substance or compressed gas cylinders

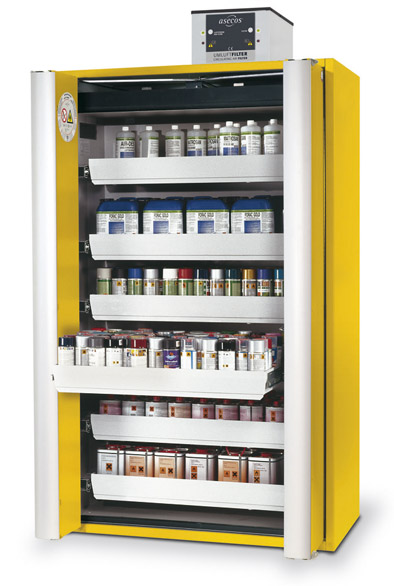
Safety cabinet with air circulation filter attachment for hazardous materials

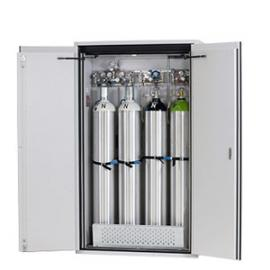
Safety cabinet for compressed gas cylinders

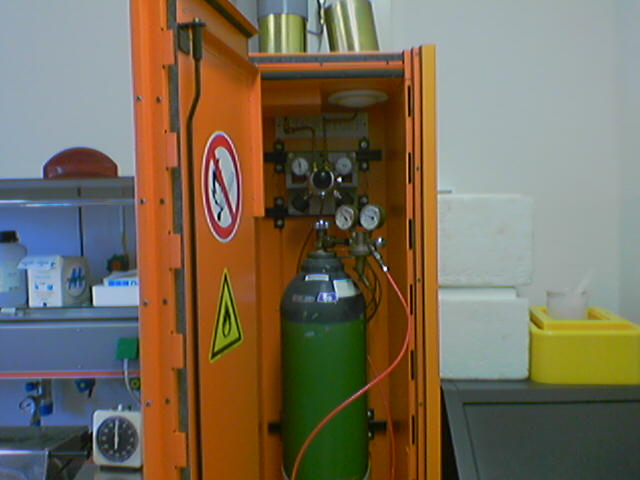
Cabinet for gas cylinders

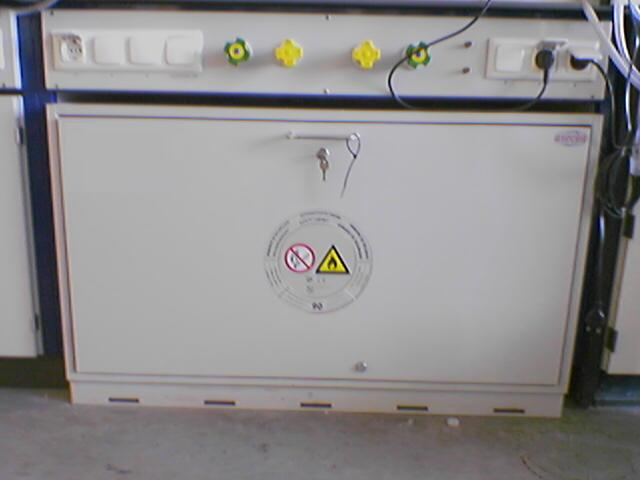
Base cabinet for hazardous substances

A safety cabinet is used for the safe storage of flammable chemical substance or compressed gas cylinders.

Primarily, they should meet three major safety requirements:

1. Minimize the fire risks associated with the storage of flammable substances and protect the cabinet's contents for a known (tested) minimum length of time (fire rating). It should prevent the materials stored in the cabinet from contributing to the spread of fire or leading to an explosion in the event of a fire
2. Minimize the amount of vapor released into the working environment
3. Retention of accidental spillages within the cabinet

Areas of application and uses are diverse: pharmaceutical, universities, hospitals, industry, workshops, public organizations working with hazardous substances etc. In essence, any facility where flammable substances are stored.

== Legislation and guidance ==
In the UK, the most relevant regulation and guidance documents regarding the storage of flammable substances are:

- DSEAR 2002: the Dangerous Substances & Explosive Atmosphere Regulations requires, by law, employers working with flammable substances to take all reasonable precautions to eliminate the danger at its source. Where possible, flammable substances should be substituted with safer materials, but where this is not possible, every effort must be made to control the substance to protect personnel, property and the environment.
- HSG51: The storage of flammable liquids in containers. This Health & Safety Guidance (HSG) publication from the HSE is aimed at anyone who has responsibility for the storage of dangerous substances, regardless of the size of storage facility. It sets out control measures aimed at eliminating or reducing risks to people at work or otherwise from the storage of packaged dangerous goods. It reflects good practice for the design of new storage facilities (and where reasonably practicable, to existing sites) and applies to transit or distribution warehouses, open-air storage compounds, and facilities associated with a chemical production site or end user.
- HSG140: This Health & Safety Guidance (HSG) publication from the HSE is for those responsible for the safe use and handling of flammable liquids in all general work activities, small-scale chemical processing and spraying processes. It explains the fire and explosion hazards associated with flammable liquids and will help you determine how to control the risks in your workplace.
- HSG71: This Health & Safety Guidance (HSG) publication from the HSE focuses on the classification of hazardous materials and the relationships of those materials with each other. Particular focus is given to general recommendations for the separation or segregation of different classes of dangerous substances, including flammable liquids. This is essential practice to prevent reaction between incompatible product types possibly having extremely severe consequences for human life and property.
- GHS: Globally harmonised system, is now the universal cross border guidance document that governs appropriate signage for safety boxes

In the US, relevant regulations include:

- OSHA 1910.106: This regulation identifies the amount of liquid that may be located outside of a storage cabinet.
- NFPA 30: Flammable and Combustible Liquids Code that establishes safeguards to reduce hazards related to volatile liquids.

Lithium-ion battery applications:

Specialized enclosures and containers are used for lithium-ion battery charging, storage, or quarantine, particularly where thermal runaway or fire-propagation concerns are involved.

== Structure ==
In the UK, the construction design and testing of safety cabinets are regulated by the British adoption of European standards BS EN 14470-1 (cabinets for flammable liquids) and BS EN 14470-2 (cabinets for pressurized gas cylinders).

Safety cabinets usually consist of the following components: inner body, fire protection insulation, outer body, fresh air inlets and exhaust air connection points with auto shut-off, automated closing mechanisms for the doors in case of fire (not with gas cylinder cabinets), heat-triggered self-expanding seals (intumescent) on the doors and optionally, an earth connection. Safety cabinets to BS EN14470-1 for flammable substances, usually have storage shelves or pull-out drawers on which the chemicals are stored. The shelves or drawers should be load-tested and be able to support the loading specified by the manufacturer. To ensure the retention of accidental spillages within the cabinet, the cabinet must be equipped with spill containment sumps.

Safety cabinets to BS EN14470-2 for pressurized gas cylinders, are designed to accommodate cylinders in working areas. The gas is supplied to the desired application via a pipeline through pipe lead-throughs in the roof of the cabinet. These pipe penetrations must be sealed to ensure fire protection. Many pressurized gas cylinder cabinets are also fitted with "rolling ramps" which are inserted into the door or can be folded out so that the fire protection seals are not damaged when the cabinet is loaded.

Models are available in various widths, heights and fire resistance classes and with a choice of door and locking systems:

- Widths (in cm): 60, 90, 120, 140
- Heights: Tall units or under-bench units available in various heights
- Fire resistance classes: F15, F30, F60, F90 or G15, G30, G60, G90 Protection against fire (in minutes)
- Door and locking systems: Wing and folding doors available with sensor-controlled and fully automated door opening/closing

=== US Construction Standards ===
In the US, safety cabinets used for flammable liquid storage are commonly designed to comply with OSHA 29 CFR 1910.106 and NFPA 30 requirements. Cabinets may also be independently tested or certified by organizations such as FM Approvals or Underwriters Laboratories (UL).

== Operation ==
Connection of safety cabinets to a permanent exhaust air system is recommended. If a safety cabinet is not connected to a technical exhaust air system, a certain area in front of and around the cabinet is considered a Zone 2 hazardous area. If the safety cabinet is connected to a 24-hour technical exhaust air system, then the hazardous area is limited to the inside of the cabinet.

To prevent damage to the cabinet by corrosion, no acids or alkalis may be accommodated in this type of cabinet: TRbF Appendix L: Storage equipment in working areas (safety cabinets)/ points 4.1 and 4.2 as well as BGR 104 2.2.8).

If the connection to an exhaust air system is not possible on site, solvent and safety cabinets can be technically ventilated with a recirculating air filter unit. These units filter the exhaust air from the cabinet through an activated carbon filter, capturing harmful vapors and returning the cleaned air to the working environment.

== Function ==
In the event of a fire and the attainment of an ambient temperature of 50 °C (+0/−10 °C), the drawers, if fitted, must first retract and the doors must automatically close. These actions are normally activated by bimetallic or fusible links. At approx. 70 °C, the fire protection valves in the fresh air inlets and exhaust air connection points auto-close. From an ambient temperature of approx. 160 °C, the intumescent seals foam up and expand to seal the joints at the doors. The cabinet is thus hermetically sealed. Safety cabinets with automatic door closing provide additional security. After a defined time interval, the cabinets close automatically, thus minimizing the exposure of the stored chemicals and reducing the risk of escaping hazardous vapors. In modern safety cabinets, a visual and acoustic warning signal is given when the door is closed. Safety cabinets for compressed gas cylinders do not have an automatic door closing function, as the doors of these cabinets must always be closed during operation.

== Performance ==
In line with the fire rating, the safety cabinet prevents the stored goods from heating up over the specified length of time. For example, a Type 30 BS EN cabinet will guarantee 30 minutes of safety before the internal temperature becomes critical. A Type 90 BS EN cabinet offers maximum safety with 90 minutes protection. For flammable liquids and solids, this temperature rise is 180 °C (K) and for pressurized gas cylinders, the permissible temperature rise is 50 °C (K).

Testing is conducted as a freestanding single cabinet in a suitable fire chamber. The entire cabinet must be exposed to the same heating conditions. The temperature rise is measured inside the cabinet according to the Unit Temperature Curve (ETK).

== Inspection and service ==
In accordance with BS EN 14470, a competent person must regularly inspect safety cabinets. This inspection should include:

- Condition of the fusible links / fire protection valves
- Condition of the fire protection insulation
- Condition of the fire protection seals (intumescent)
- Condition of the hinges
- Functionality of the door closing
- Functionality of the door interlock
- Condition of the body (corrosion)
- Compliance with Ex-areas
- Measurement of the exhaust air volume flow (for technical ventilation)

It is also a requirement of section 6 of the Health and Safety at Work etc. Act 1974 that equipment for use at work are regularly cleaned or maintained.
