= Gas cylinder =

Cylindrical container for storing pressurised gas

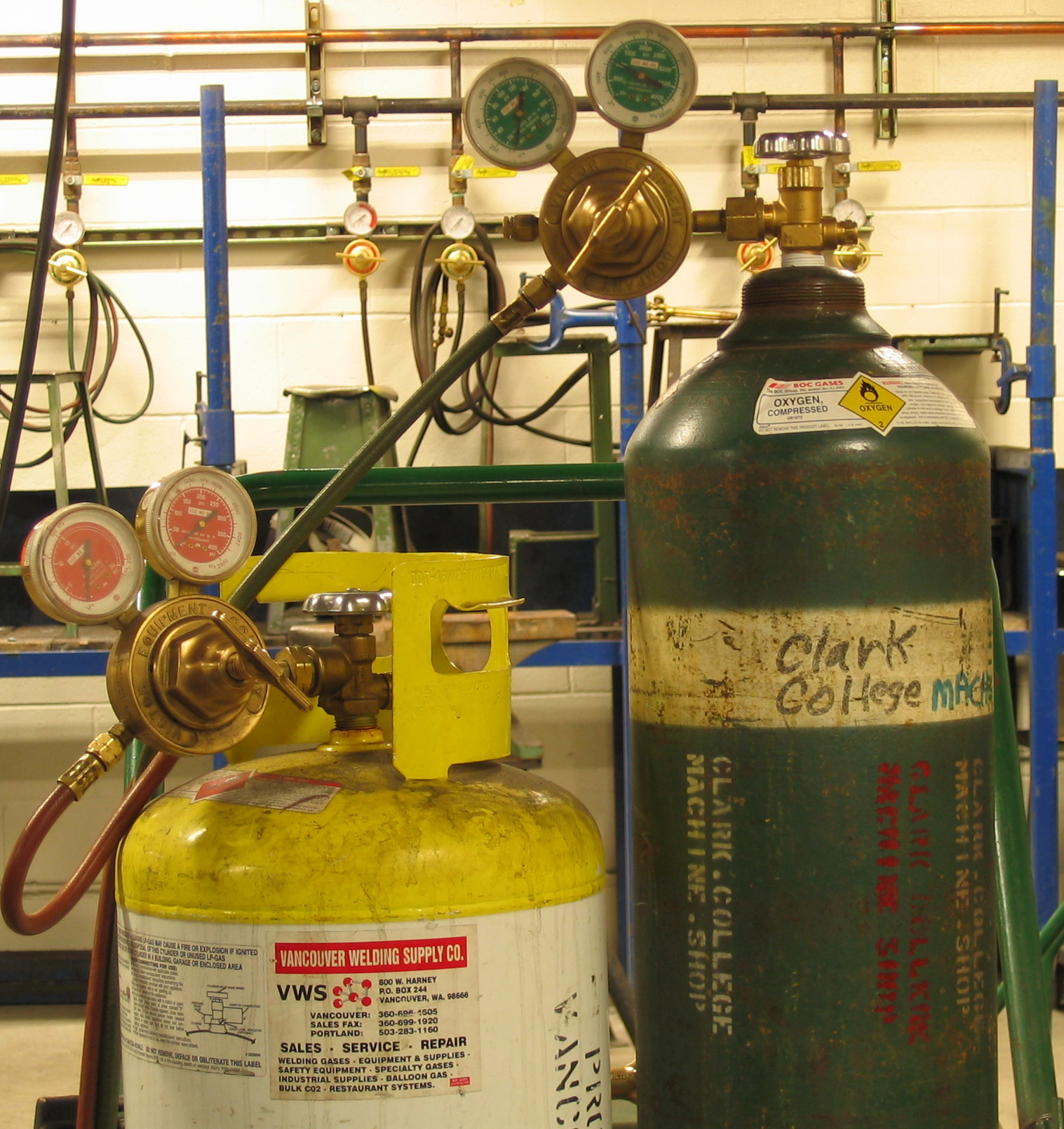
Industrial compressed gas cylinders used for oxy-fuel welding and cutting of steel.

A gas cylinder is a pressure vessel for storage and containment of gases at above atmospheric pressure. Gas storage cylinders may also be called bottles. Inside the cylinder the stored contents may be in a state of compressed gas, vapor over liquid, supercritical fluid, or dissolved in a substrate material, depending on the physical characteristics of the contents. A typical gas cylinder design is elongated, standing upright on a flattened or dished bottom end or foot ring, with the cylinder valve screwed into the internal neck thread at the top for connecting to the filling or receiving apparatus.

== Nomenclature ==
Gas cylinders may be grouped by several characteristics, such as construction method, material, pressure group, class of contents, transportability, and re-usability. The size of a pressurised gas container that may be classed as a gas cylinder is typically 0.5 litres to 150 litres. Smaller containers may be termed gas cartridges, and larger may be termed gas tubes, tanks, or other specific type of pressure vessel. A gas cylinder is used to store gas or liquefied gas at pressures above normal atmospheric pressure. In South Africa, a gas storage cylinder implies a refillable transportable container with a water capacity volume of up to 150 litres. Refillable transportable cylindrical containers from 150 to 3,000 litres water capacity are referred to as tubes.

A pressure receptacle is a general term for cylinders, bundles, tubes and pressure drums for the storage and transportation of compressed or liquefied gases with a water capacity from 0,5 L to 3000 L, and may be refillable or non refillable. Alternative terms include "transportable gas containers" and "transportable pressure containers".

In the United States, "bottled gas" typically refers to liquefied petroleum gas. "Bottled gas" is sometimes used in medical supply, especially for portable high pressure oxygen cylinders. Packaged industrial gases are frequently called "cylinder gas", though "bottled gas" is sometimes used. The term propane tank is also used for cylinders for propane.

The United Kingdom and other parts of Europe more commonly refer to "bottled gas" when discussing any usage, whether industrial, medical, or liquefied petroleum. In contrast, what is called liquefied petroleum gas in the United States is known generically in the United Kingdom as "LPG" and it may be ordered by using one of several trade names, or specifically as butane or propane, depending on the required heat output.

The term cylinder in this context is sometimes confused with tank, the latter being an open-top or vented container that stores liquids under gravity, though the term scuba tank is commonly used to refer to a compressed gas cylinder used for breathing gas supply to an underwater breathing apparatus.

=== Components ===
- Cylinder – Either the shell or the complete assembly of shell and all accessories directly attached to the shell, depending on context.
- Shell – The pressure vessel as a whole, excepting accessories.
  - Shoulder – The end of the shell with a neck or boss into which the valve is fitted.
    - Neck – A coaxial cylindrical extension of the shoulder with a threaded hole into which the cylinder valve or a gas pipe connection is fitted.
    - Boss – A sturdy insert, usually in the centre of the shoulder, into which a valve or gas pipe connection is fitted.
  - Base or foot – The end of the shell opposite the shoulder.
  - Liner – The core on which filament windings are laid. The core may be structural (usually metal), and share the pressure loads, or purely to separate composite wrapping from the cylinder contents, (metal or engineering plastic).
- Cylinder valve – a shutoff valve directly coupled to the cylinder shell at the neck or boss which is opened to allow gas flow into or out of the cylinder, and closed to prevent such flow. It usually has a threaded inlet/outlet opening to which other equipment can be connected, but in some cases may have an integral pressure regulator on the outlet side, and a separate inlet opening for filling.
- Foot ring – A permanently attached ring fitted to the base on which the cylinder can stand.
- Valve guard – A fitting (cap or collar) screwed or clamped to the shoulder, defending the valve from impact during transport, and in some cases, when in use.
- Permanent markings – Information identifying the cylinder and its specification, stamped into the outside of the shoulder on metal cylinders. On composite cylinders permanent makings can be a printed label encapsulated under the resin or covered by a permanent transparent coating on the shoulder or side wall of the cylinder.

=== Types ===
Since fibre-composite materials have been used to reinforce pressure vessels, various types of cylinder distinguished by the construction method and materials used have been defined:

- Type 1: Metal only. Mostly seamless forged metal, but for lower working pressure, e.g., liquefied butane, welded steel vessels are also used.
- Type 2: Metal vessel, hoop wrapped with a fibre composite only around the cylindrical part of the "cylinder". (Geometrically there is a need for twice the tensile strength on the cylindrical region in comparison to the spherical caps of the cylinder.)
- Type 3: Thin metal liner (that keeps the vessel gas tight, but does not contribute to the strength) fully wrapped with fibre composite material.
- Type 4: Metal-free liner of plastic, fully wrapped with fibre composite material. The neck of the cylinder which includes the thread for the valve is a metal insert.
- Type 5: Linerless fully wrapped with fibre composite material. The neck of the cylinder is a threaded metal insert embedded into the fiber. A temporary liner may be used for the winding and curing process, the temporary liner may or may may not be removed depending on manufacturing preferences.

=== Cylinder assemblies ===
Assemblies comprising a group of cylinders mounted together for combined use or transport:

- Bank – A group of cylinders connected to a gas distribution system for bulk storage, where the individual cylinders may be used together or separately, but are not necessarily supported by a structure which can be used to transport them as a group.
- Cascade – A bank when used in cascade.
- Quad or bundle, also occasionally gas pack or gas battery – A bank of high pressure gas storage cylinders, typically mounted upright on a rectangular frame for transport, and manifolded together. A pallet is a similar appearing group of cylinders on a lifting frame with no functional connections. The maximum combined cylinder volume for a bundle is 3000 litres for non-toxic gases and 1000 litres for toxic gases. Gas bundles are specified by ISO 10961:2019 Gas cylinders — Cylinder bundles — Design, manufacture, testing and inspection.
- Rack – A structure to hold cylinders safely upright or horizontal while in use, for transport, or in storage.

== Materials ==
All-metal cylinders are the most rugged and usually the most economical option, but are relatively heavy. Steel is generally the most resistant to rough handling and most economical, and is often lighter than aluminium for the same working pressure, capacity, and form factor due to its higher specific strength. The inspection interval of industrial steel cylinders has increased from 5 or 6 years to 10 years. Diving cylinders that are used in water must be inspected more often; intervals tend to range between 1 and 5 years. Steel cylinders may continue to be used indefinitely providing they pass periodic inspection and testing. When they were found to have inherent structural problems, certain steel and aluminium alloys were withdrawn from service, or discontinued from new production, while existing cylinders may require different inspection or testing, but remain in service provided they pass these tests.

For very high pressures, composites have a greater mass advantage. Due to the very high tensile strength of carbon fiber reinforced polymer, these vessels can be very light, but are more expensive to manufacture. Filament wound composite cylinders are used in fire fighting breathing apparatus, high altitude climbing, and oxygen first aid equipment because of their low weight, but are rarely used for diving, due to their high positive buoyancy. They are occasionally used when portability for accessing the dive site is critical, such as in cave diving where the water surface is far from the cave entrance. Composite cylinders certified to ISO-11119-2 or ISO-11119-3 may only be used for underwater applications if they are manufactured in accordance with the requirements for underwater use and are marked "UW".

Cylinders reinforced with or made from a fibre reinforced material usually must be inspected more frequently than metal cylinders, e.g., every 5 instead of 10 years, and must be inspected more thoroughly than metal cylinders as they are more susceptible to impact damage. They may also have a limited service life. Fibre composite cylinders were originally specified for a limited life span of 15, 20 or 30 years, but this has been extended when they proved to be suitable for longer service.

== Design ==
The primary design focus for seamless metal (steel and aluminium) high pressure cylinders is on cylindrical wall thickness. This is calculated using the Lamé-von Mises formula for thick walled cylinders. Where the application may impose significant bending, torsional or local loads, these stresses must also be considered. Cylinder ends are generally approximately hemispherical, and require consideration for openings for internal inspection, filling and access to the contents. A corrosion allowance may be added to the design thickness to allow for surface corrosion over the service life where applicable, and the stresses are generally limited so that the test pressure stress is within the fatigue limit for steel cylinders.

The end dome thickness is usually determined by manufacturing process constraints, and for forged and spun ends the thickness tends to be greater than the cylindrical wall, though the pressure stresses in a spherical shell are roughly half those in a cylinder, making the ends much heavier than they need to be to theoretically withstand the pressure load. This extra thickness makes the ends relatively strong and able to support local stress concentrations due to stamp markings and neck threads. In seamless metal cylinders the thicker end wall and relatively small internal volume of the ends make the ends considerably heavier than the cylindrical section for the internal volume contribution, so this type of cylinder tends to be lighter per unit volume when the cylindrical part is longer.

- Thin-walled cylinder (for wall thickness less than 0.1 of the outside radius) stress. See: Cylinder stress#Thin-walled assumption
- Thick-walled cylinder (for any wall thickness) stress. See: Cylinder stress#Thick-walled vessels

=== Pressure rating ===
The thickness of the cylinder wall is a function of the material the pressure and the diameter. The thickness of the ends is also affected by the manufacturing process.

- Working pressure is the pressure that the cylinder is designed to withstand under working conditions at the nominal reference temperature.
- Test pressure is the pressure the cylinder must withstand periodically when tested for revalidation. Hydrostatic test pressure (TP) is specified by the manufacturing standard. For seamless metal high-pressure cylinders, this is usually 1.5 × working pressure, or in the United States, 1.67 × working pressure.
- Developed pressure: Cylinder working pressure is specified at a reference temperature, usually 15 °C or 20 °C, and cylinders also have a specified maximum safe working temperature, often 65 °C. The actual pressure in the cylinder will vary with temperature, as described by the gas laws, but this is acceptable in terms of the standards provided that the developed pressure when corrected to the reference temperature does not exceed the specified working pressure stamped on the cylinder. This allows cylinders to be safely and legally filled to a pressure that is higher than the specified working pressure when the filling temperature is greater than the reference temperature, but not more than 65 °C, provided that the filling pressure does not exceed the developed pressure for that temperature, and cylinders filled according to this provision will be at the correct working pressure when cooled to the reference temperature.

== Manufacturing processes ==
=== Type 1 seamless metal cylinders ===
The Type 1 pressure vessel is a seamless cylinder normally made of cold-extruded aluminum or forged steel. The pressure vessel comprises a cylindrical section of even wall thickness, with a thicker base at one end, and domed shoulder with a central neck to attach a cylinder valve or manifold at the other end. Occasionally other materials may be used. Inconel has been used for non-magnetic and highly corrosion resistant oxygen compatible spherical high-pressure gas containers for the US Navy's Mk-15 and Mk-16 mixed gas rebreathers, and a few other military rebreathers.

==== Aluminium ====
Most aluminum cylinders are flat bottomed, allowing them to stand upright on a level surface, but some were manufactured with domed bottoms. Aluminum cylinders are usually manufactured by cold extrusion of aluminum billets in a process which first presses the walls and base, then trims the top edge of the cylinder walls, followed by press forming the shoulder and neck. The final structural process is machining the neck outer surface, boring and cutting the neck threads and O-ring groove. The cylinder is then heat-treated, tested and stamped with the required permanent markings. The extrusion process forms the bottom to match the shape of the die, so a curved or flat bottom can be chosen to fit the requirements of the end user.

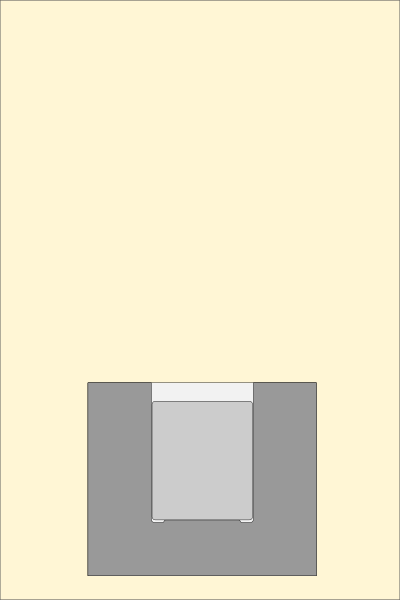
Section of die with billet inserted

Cold extrusion process

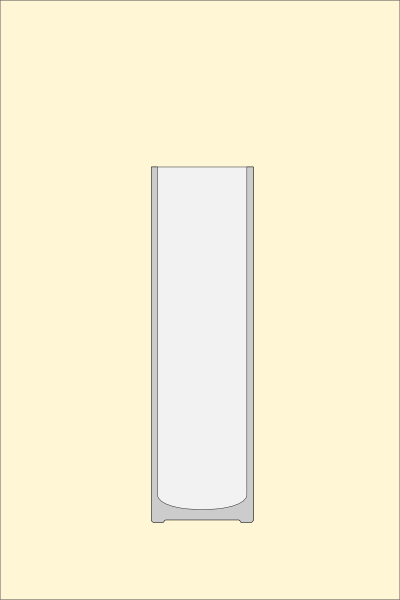
Extrusion product before trimming

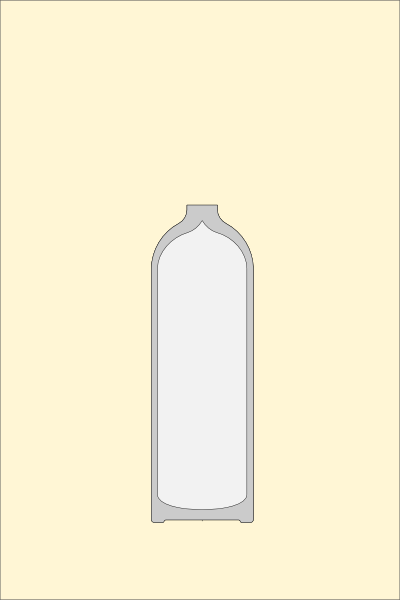
Section after closure of the top end

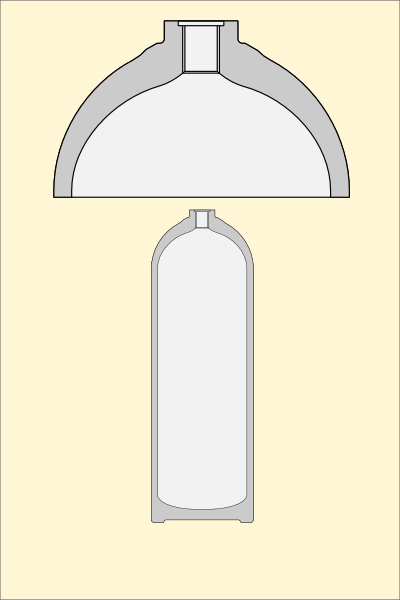
Section showing machined areas of the neck in detail

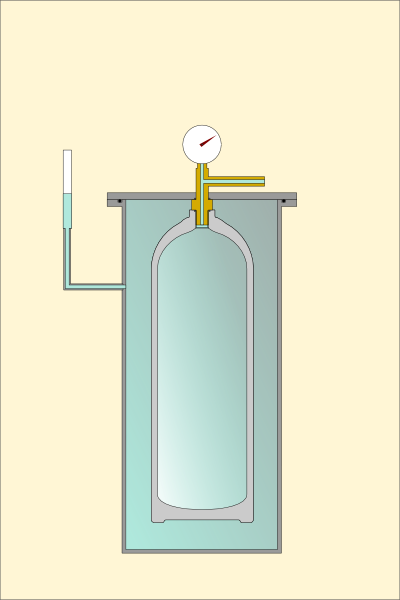
Hydrostatic test

==== Steel ====
Animation showing two stages of deep drawing of a steel plate to a cup, and a similar cup to a diving cylinder blank with domed bottom

Steel cylinders are often used because they are harder and more resistant to external surface impact and abrasion damage, and can tolerate higher temperatures without affecting material properties. They also may have a lower mass than aluminium cylinders with the same gas capacity, due to considerably higher specific strength. Steel cylinders are more susceptible than aluminium to external corrosion, particularly in seawater, and may be galvanized or coated with corrosion barrier paints to resist corrosion damage. It is not difficult to monitor external corrosion, and repair the paint when damaged, and steel cylinders which are well maintained have a long service life, often longer than aluminium cylinders, as they are not susceptible to fatigue damage when filled within their safe working pressure limits and re-validated to the appropriate test pressure.

Steel cylinders are manufactured with domed (convex) and dished (concave) bottoms. The dished profile allows them to stand upright on a horizontal surface, and is the standard shape for industrial cylinders. The cylinders used for emergency gas supply on diving bells are often this shape, and commonly have a water capacity of about 50 litres. Domed bottoms give a larger volume for the same cylinder mass, and are the standard for scuba cylinders up to 18 litres water capacity, though some concave bottomed cylinders have been marketed for scuba. Domed end industrial cylinders may be fitted with a press-fitted foot ring to allow upright standing.

Steel alloys used for gas cylinder manufacture are authorised by the manufacturing standard. For example, the US standard DOT 3AA requires the use of open-hearth, basic oxygen, or electric steel of uniform quality. Approved alloys include 4130X, NE-8630, 9115, 9125, Carbon-boron and Intermediate manganese, with specified constituents, including manganese and carbon, and molybdenum, chromium, boron, nickel or zirconium.

===== Drawn from plate =====
Steel cylinders may be manufactured from steel plate discs stamped from annealed plate or coil, which are lubricated and cold drawn to a cylindrical cup form, by a hydraulic press, this is annealed and drawn again in two or three stages, until the final diameter and wall thickness is reached. They generally have a domed base if intended for the scuba market, so they cannot stand up by themselves. For industrial use a dished base allows the cylinder to stand on the end on a flat surface. After forming the base and side walls, the top of the cylinder is trimmed to length, heated and hot spun to form the shoulder and close the neck. This process thickens the material of the shoulder. The cylinder is heat-treated by quenching and tempering to provide the best strength and toughness.

The cylinders are machined to provide the neck thread and o-ring seat (if applicable), then chemically cleaned or shot-blasted inside and out to remove mill scale. After inspection and hydrostatic testing they are stamped with the required permanent markings, followed by external coating with a corrosion barrier paint or hot dip galvanising and final inspection.

===== Spun from seamless tube =====
A related method is to start with seamless steel tube of a suitable diameter and wall thickness, manufactured by a process such as the Mannesmann process, and to close both ends by the hot spinning process. This method is particularly suited to high pressure gas storage tubes, which usually have a threaded neck opening at both ends, so that both ends are processed alike. When a neck opening is only required at one end, the base is spun first and dressed inside for a uniform smooth surface, then the process of closing the shoulder and forming the neck is the same as for the pressed plate method.

===== Forged from billet =====
An alternative production method is backward extrusion of a heated steel billet, similar to the cold extrusion process for aluminium cylinders, followed by hot drawing and bottom forming to reduce wall thickness, and trimming of the top edge in preparation for shoulder and neck formation by hot spinning. The other processes are much the same for all production methods.

===== Cylinder neck =====
The neck of the cylinder is the part of the end which is shaped as a narrow concentric cylinder, and internally threaded to fit a cylinder valve. There are several standards for neck threads, which include parallel threads where the seal is by an O-ring gasket, and taper threads which seal along the contact surface by deformation of the contact surfaces, and on thread tape or sealing compound.

==== Type 2 hoop wrapped metal liner ====
Type 2 is hoop wrapped with fibre reinforced resin over the cylindrical part of the cylinder, where circumferential load is highest. The fibres share the circumferential load with the metal core, and achieve a significant weight saving due to efficient stress distribution and high specific strength and stiffness of the composite. The core is a seamless metal cylinder, manufactured in any of the ways suitable for a type 1 cylinder, but with thinner walls, as they only carry about half the load, mainly the axial load. Hoop winding is at an angle to the length axis of close to 90°, so the fibres carry negligible axial load.

==== Type 3 fully wrapped thin metal liner ====
Type 3 is wrapped over the entire cylinder except for the neck, and the metal liner is mainly to make the cylinder gas tight, so very little load is carried by the liner. Winding angles are optimised to carry all the loads (axial and circumferential) from the pressurised gas in the cylinder. Only the neck metal is exposed on the outside. This construction can save in the order of 30% of the mass compared with type 2, as the fibre composite has a higher specific strength than the metal of the type 2 liner that it replaces.

==== Type 4 fully wrapped plastic liner ====
Type 4 is wrapped in the same way as type 3, but the liner is non-metallic. A metal neck boss is fitted to the shoulder of the plastic liner before winding, and this carries the neck threads for the cylinder valve. The outside of the neck of the insert is not covered by the fibre wrapping, and may have axial ridges to engage with a wrench or clamp for torsional support when fitting or removing the cylinder valve. There is a mass reduction compared with type 3 due to the lower density of the plastic liner.

==== Welded gas cylinders ====
A welded gas cylinder comprises two or more shell components joined by welding. The most commonly used material is steel, but stainless steel, aluminium and other alloys can be used when they are better suited to the application. Steel is strong, resistant to physical damage, easy to weld, relatively low cost, and usually adequate for corrosion resistance, and provides an economical product.

The components of the shell are usually domed ends, and often a rolled cylindrical centre section. The ends are usually domed by cold pressing from a circular blank, and may be drawn in two or more stages to get the final shape, which is generally semi-elliptical in section. The end blank is typically punched from sheet, drawn to the required section, edges trimmed to size and necked for overlap where appropriate, and hole(s) for the neck and other fittings punched. The neck boss is inserted from the concave side and welded in place before shell assembly.

Smaller cylinders are typically assembled from a top and bottom dome, with an equatorial weld seam. Larger cylinders with a longer cylindrical body comprise dished ends circumferentially welded to a rolled central cylindrical section with a single longitudinal welded seam. Welding is typically automated gas metal arc welding.

Typical accessories which are welded to the outside of the cylinder include a foot ring, a valve guard with lifting handles, and a neck boss threaded for the valve. Occasionally other through-shell and external fittings are also welded on. After welding, the assembly may be heat treated for stress-relief and to improve mechanical characteristics, cleaned by shotblasting, and coated with a protective and decorative coating. Testing and inspection for quality control will take place at various stages of production.

== Regulations and testing ==
The transportation of high-pressure cylinders is regulated by many governments throughout the world. Various levels of testing are generally required by the governing authority for the country in which it is to be transported while filled. In the United States, this authority is the United States Department of Transportation (DOT). Similarly in the UK, the European transport regulations (ADR) are implemented by the Department for Transport (DfT). For Canada, this authority is Transport Canada (TC). Cylinders may have additional requirements placed on design and or performance from independent testing agencies such as Underwriters Laboratories (UL). Each manufacturer of high-pressure cylinders is required to have an independent quality agent that will inspect the product for quality and safety.

Within the UK the "competent authority" — the Department for Transport (DfT) — implements the regulations and appointment of authorised cylinder testers is conducted by United Kingdom Accreditation Service (UKAS), who make recommendations to the Vehicle Certification Agency (VCA) for approval of individual bodies.

There are a variety of tests that may be performed on various cylinders. Some of the most common types of tests are hydrostatic test, burst test, ultimate tensile strength, Charpy impact test and pressure cycling.

During the manufacturing process, vital information is usually stamped or permanently marked on the cylinder. This information usually includes the type of cylinder, the working or service pressure, the serial number, date of manufacture, the manufacture's registered code and sometimes the test pressure. Other information may also be stamped, depending on the regulation requirements.

High-pressure cylinders that are used multiple times — as most are — can be hydrostatically or ultrasonically tested and visually examined every few years. In the United States, hydrostatic or ultrasonic testing is required either every five years or every ten years, depending on cylinder and its service.

== Valve connections ==
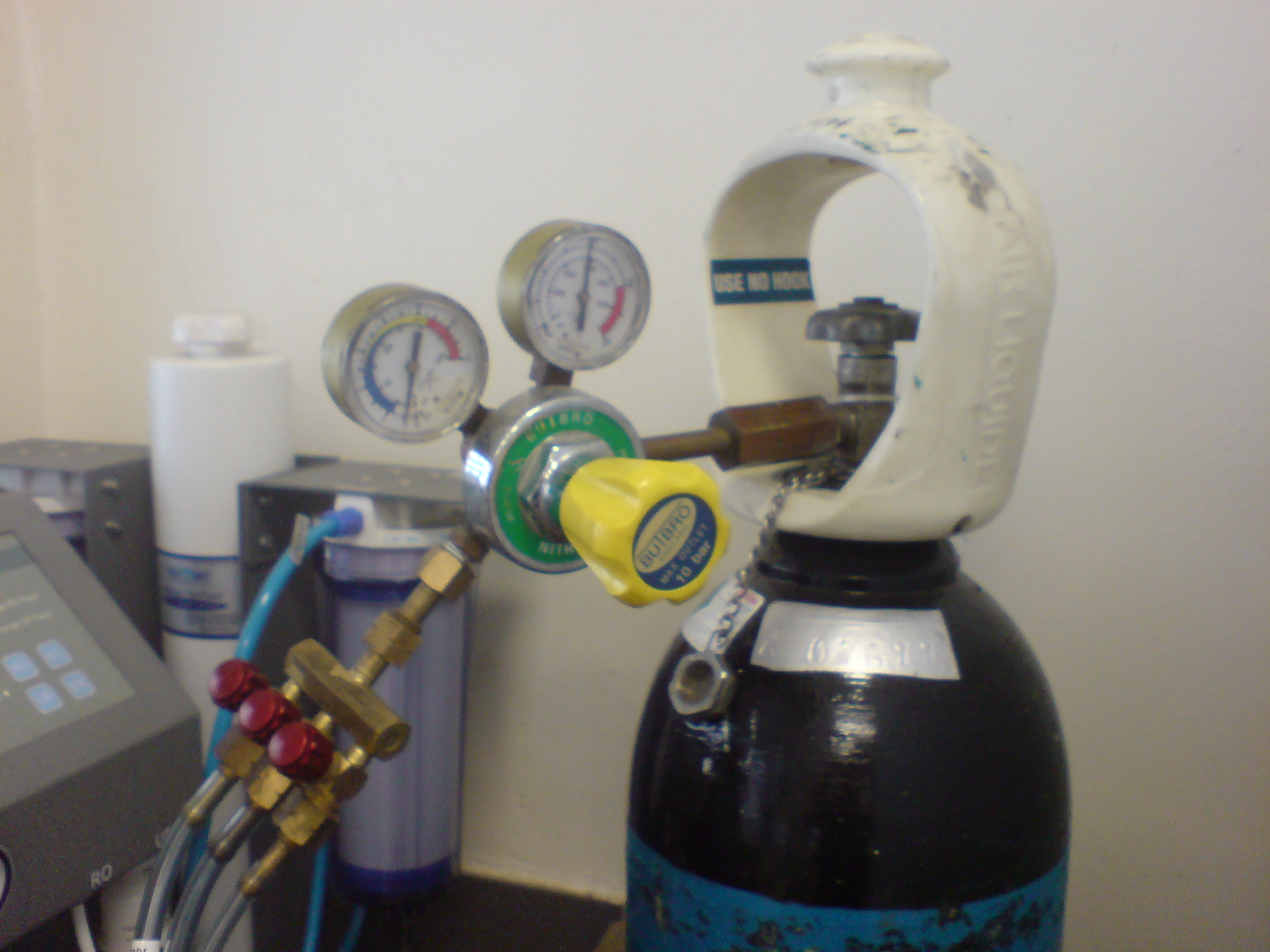
A gas regulator attached to a nitrogen cylinder. From right — cylinder valve, cylinder pressure gauge, pressure control valve (yellow) on regulator (green), outlet pressure gauge, 3-way outlet terminated by needle valves.

=== Neck thread ===
Cylinder neck thread can be to any one of several standards. Both taper thread sealed with thread tape and parallel thread sealed with an O-ring have been found satisfactory for high pressure service, but each has advantages and disadvantages for specific use cases, and if there are no regulatory requirements, the type may be chosen to suit the application.

A tapered thread provides simple assembly, but requires high torque for establishing a reliable seal, which causes high radial forces in the neck, and has a limited number of times it can be used before it is excessively deformed. This can be extended a bit by always returning the same fitting to the same cylinder, and avoiding over-tightening.

In Australia, Europe and North America, tapered neck threads are generally preferred for inert, flammable, corrosive and toxic gases, but when aluminium cylinders are used for oxygen service to United States Department of Transportation (DOT) or Transport Canada (TC) specifications in North America, the cylinders must have parallel thread. DOT and TC allow UN pressure vessels to have tapered or parallel threaded openings. In the US, 49 CFR Part 171.11 applies, and in Canada, CSA B340-18 and CSA B341-18. In Europe and other parts of the world, tapered thread is preferred for cylinder inlets for oxidising gases.

Scuba cylinders typically have a much shorter interval between internal inspections, so the use of tapered thread is less satisfactory due to the limited number of times a tapered thread valve can be re-used before it wears out, so parallel thread is generally used for this application.

Parallel thread can be tightened sufficiently to form a good seal with the O-ring without lubrication, which is an advantage when the lubricant may react with the O-ring or the contents. Repeated secure installations are possible with different combinations of valve and cylinder provided they have compatible thread and correct O-ring seals. Parallel thread is more likely to give the technician warning of residual internal pressure by leaking or extruding the O-ring before catastrophic failure when the O-ring seal is broken during removal of the valve. The O-ring size must be correct for the combination of cylinder and valve, and the material must be compatible with the contents and any lubricant used.

=== Valve ===
Gas cylinders usually have an angle stop valve at one end, and the cylinder is usually oriented so the valve is on top. During storage, transportation, and handling when the gas is not in use, a cap may be screwed over the protruding valve to protect it from damage or breaking off in case the cylinder were to fall over. Instead of a cap, cylinders sometimes have a protective collar or neck ring around the valve assembly which has an opening for access to fit a regulator or other fitting to the valve outlet, and access to operate the valve. Installation of valves for high pressure aluminum alloy cylinders is described in the guidelines: CGA V-11, Guideline for the Installation of Valves into High Pressure Aluminum Alloy Cylinders and ISO 13341, Transportable gas cylinders—Fitting of valves to gas cylinders.

=== Connection ===
The valves on industrial, medical and diving cylinders usually have threads or connection geometries of different handedness, sizes and types that depend on the category of gas, making it more difficult to mistakenly misuse a gas. For example, a hydrogen cylinder valve outlet does not fit an oxygen regulator and supply line, which could result in catastrophe. Some fittings use a right-hand thread, while others use a left-hand thread; left-hand thread fittings are usually identifiable by notches or grooves cut into them, and are usually used for flammable gases.

In the United States, valve connections are sometimes referred to as CGA connections, since the Compressed Gas Association (CGA) publishes guidelines on what connections to use for what gasses. For example, an argon cylinder may have a "CGA 580" connection on the valve. High purity gases sometimes use CGA-DISS ("Diameter Index Safety System") connections.

Common cylinder valve connections
Gas type	CGA valve outlet (USA)
Acetylene	510
Air, breathing	346, 347
Air, industrial	590
Argon	580, 718, 680 (3,500 psi), 677 (6,000 psi)
Butane	510
Carbon dioxide	320, 716
Carbon monoxide	350, 724
Chlorine	660, 728
Helium	580, 718, 680 (3,500 psi)
Hydrogen	350, 724, 695 (3,500 psi)
Methane	350
Neon	580, 718
Nitrogen	580, 718, 680 (3,500 psi), 677 (6,000 psi)
Nitrous oxide	326, 712
Oxygen	540, 714
Oxygen mixtures (>23.5%)	296
Propane	510
Xenon	580, 718

Medical gases may use the Pin Index Safety System to prevent incorrect connection of gases to services.

In the European Union, DIN connections are more common than in the United States.

In the UK, the British Standards Institution sets the standards. Included among the standards is the use left-hand threaded valves for flammable gas cylinders (most commonly brass, BS4, valves for non-corrosive cylinder contents or stainless steel, BS15, valves for corrosive contents). Non flammable gas cylinders are fitted with right-hand threaded valves (most commonly brass, BS3, valves for non-corrosive components or stainless steel, BS14, valves for corrosive contents).

Common cylinder valve connections
Gas type	BS valve outlet (UK)
Acetylene	2, 4
Air, breathing	3
Air, industrial	3
Argon	3
Butane	4
Carbon dioxide	8
Carbon monoxide	4
Chlorine	6
Helium	3
Hydrogen	4
Methane	4
Neon	3
Nitrogen	3
Nitrous oxide	13
Oxygen	3
Oxygen mixtures (>23.5%)	Other guides apply
Propane	4
Xenon	3

=== Regulator ===
When the gas in the cylinder is to be used at low pressure, the cap is taken off and a pressure-regulating assembly is attached to the stop valve. This attachment typically has a pressure regulator with upstream (inlet) and downstream (outlet) pressure gauges and a further downstream needle valve and outlet connection. For gases that remain gaseous under ambient storage conditions, the upstream pressure gauge can be used to estimate how much gas is left in the cylinder according to pressure. For gases that are liquid under storage, e.g., propane, the outlet pressure is dependent on the vapor pressure of the gas, and does not fall until the cylinder is nearly exhausted, although it will vary according to the temperature of the cylinder contents. The regulator is adjusted to control the downstream pressure, which will limit the maximum flow of gas out of the cylinder at the pressure shown by the downstream gauge. For some purposes, such as shielding gas for arc welding, the regulator will also have a flowmeter on the downstream side.

The regulator outlet connection is attached to whatever needs the gas supply.

== Safety and standards ==
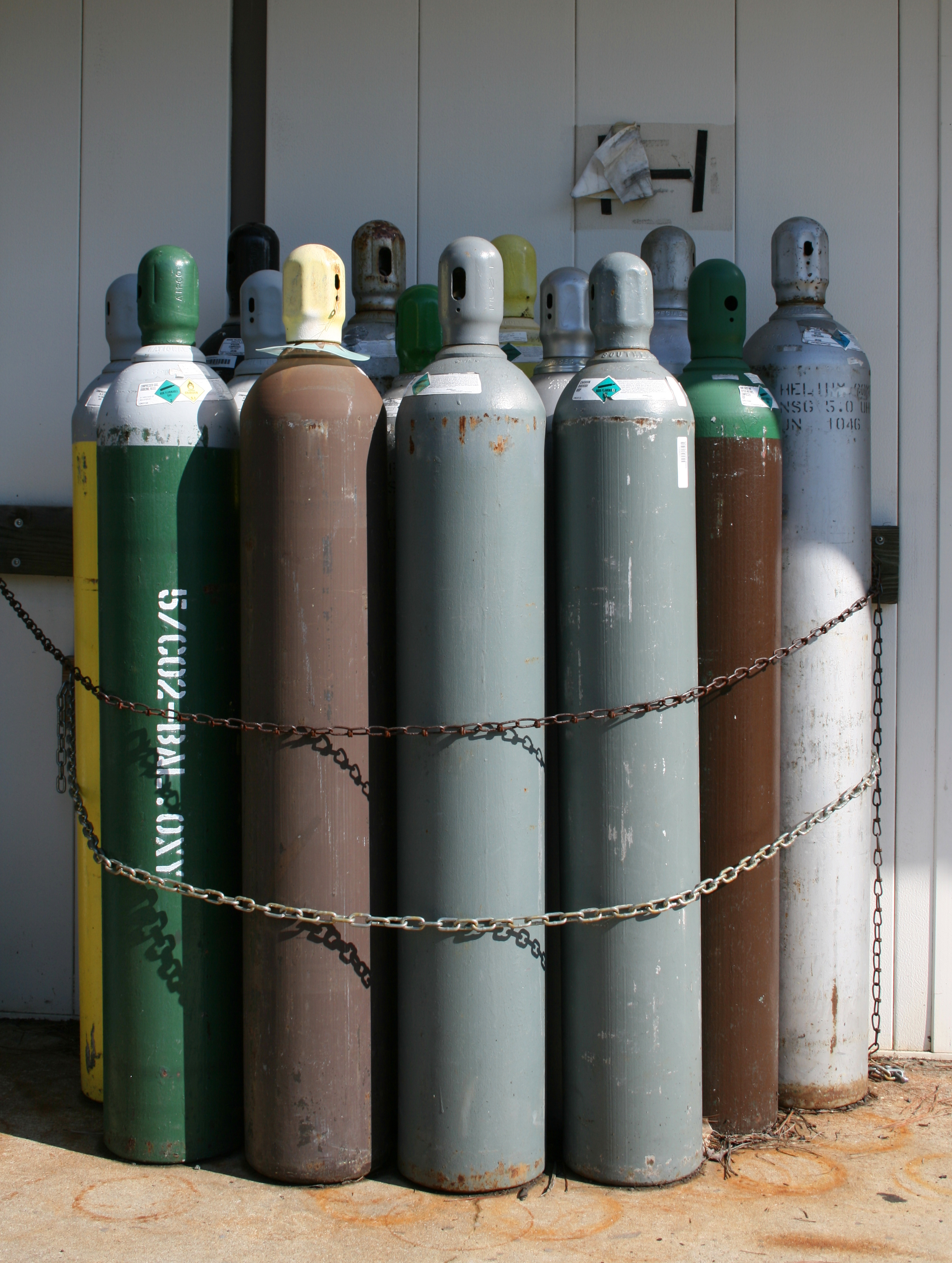
It would be safer to have cylinders individually anchored in a cool place, rather than chained in a cluster in the sun, as seen here.

Because the contents are under pressure and are sometimes hazardous materials, handling bottled gases is regulated. Regulations may include chaining bottles to prevent falling and damaging the valve, proper ventilation to prevent injury or death in case of leaks and signage to indicate the potential hazards. If a compressed gas cylinder falls over, causing the valve block to be sheared off, the rapid release of high-pressure gas may cause the cylinder to be violently accelerated, potentially causing property damage, injury, or death. To prevent this, cylinders are normally secured to a fixed object or transport cart with a strap or chain. They can also be stored in a safety cabinet.

In a fire, the pressure in a gas cylinder rises in direct proportion to its temperature. If the internal pressure exceeds the mechanical limitations of the cylinder and there are no means to safely vent the pressurized gas to the atmosphere, the vessel will fail mechanically. If the vessel contents are flammable, this event may result in a "fireball". Oxidisers such as oxygen and fluorine will produce a similar effect by accelerating combustion in the area affected. If the cylinder's contents are liquid, but become a gas at ambient conditions, this is commonly referred to as a boiling liquid expanding vapour explosion (BLEVE).

Medical gas cylinders in the UK and some other countries have a fusible plug of Wood's metal in the valve block between the valve seat and the cylinder. This plug melts at a comparatively low temperature (70 °C) and allows the contents of the cylinder to escape to the surroundings before the cylinder is significantly weakened by the heat, lessening the risk of explosion. Fusible plugs are also used on some acetylene cylinders. More common pressure relief devices are a simple burst disc installed in the base of the valve between the cylinder and the valve seat. A burst disc is a small metal gasket engineered to rupture at a pre-determined pressure. Some burst discs are backed with a low-melting-point metal, so that the valve must be exposed to excessive heat before the burst disc can rupture. The Compressed Gas Association publishes a number of booklets and pamphlets on safe handling and use of bottled gases.

=== International and national standards ===
There is a wide range of standards relating to the manufacture, use and testing of pressurised gas cylinders and related components. Some examples are listed here.

- ISO 11439: Gas cylinders — High-pressure cylinders for the on-board storage of natural gas as a fuel for automotive vehicles
- ISO 15500-5: Road vehicles — Compressed natural gas (CNG) fuel system components — Part 5: Manual cylinder valve
- US DOT CFR Title 49, part 178, Subpart C — Specification for Cylinders
- US DOT Aluminum Tank Alloy 6351-T6 amendment for SCUBA, SCBA, Oxygen Service — Visual Eddy inspection
- AS 2896-2011:Medical gas systems—Installation and testing of non-flammable medical gas pipeline systems pipeline systems (Australian Standards).
- EN 1964-3 – Transportable gas cylinders. Specification for the design and construction of refillable transportable seamless steel gas cylinders of water capacities capacity from 0,5 litre up to 150 litre
- ISO 9809-1: Gas Cylinders–Refillable Seamless Steel Gas Cylinders–Design, Construction and Testing–Part 1: Quenched and Tempered Steel Cylinders with Tensile Strength less than 1 100 MPa
- ISO 9809-2: Gas Cylinders–Refillable Seamless Steel Gas Cylinders–Design, Construction and Testing–Part 2: Quenched and Tempered Steel Cylinders with Tensile Strength Greater than or Equal to 1 100 MPa
- ISO 9809-3: Gas Cylinders–Refillable Seamless Steel Gas Cylinders–Design, Construction and Testing–Part 3: Normalized Steel Cylinders
- EN ISO 11120 – Gas cylinders. Refillable seamless steel tubes of water capacity between 150 l and 3000 l. Design, construction and testing (ISO 11120:2015)
- EN 1975 – Transportable gas cylinders. Specification for the design and construction of refillable transportable seamless aluminium and aluminium alloy gas cylinders of capacity from 0,5 litre up to 150 litre
- EN 84/526/EEC – Aluminium high pressure gas cylinder design
- EN 12245 – Transportable gas cylinders Fully wrapped composite cylinders
- ISO 11119-1 Gas cylinders — Design, construction and testing of refillable composite gas cylinders and tubes — Part 1: Hoop wrapped fibre reinforced composite gas cylinders and tubes up to 450 l
- HOAL — Home Office Aluminium — UK seamless aluminium high pressure cylinder manufacturing standards HOAL1, HOAL2, HOAL3 and HOAL4 (superseded) in HE30/AA6082 or AA6351 alloys.

=== Transportation ===
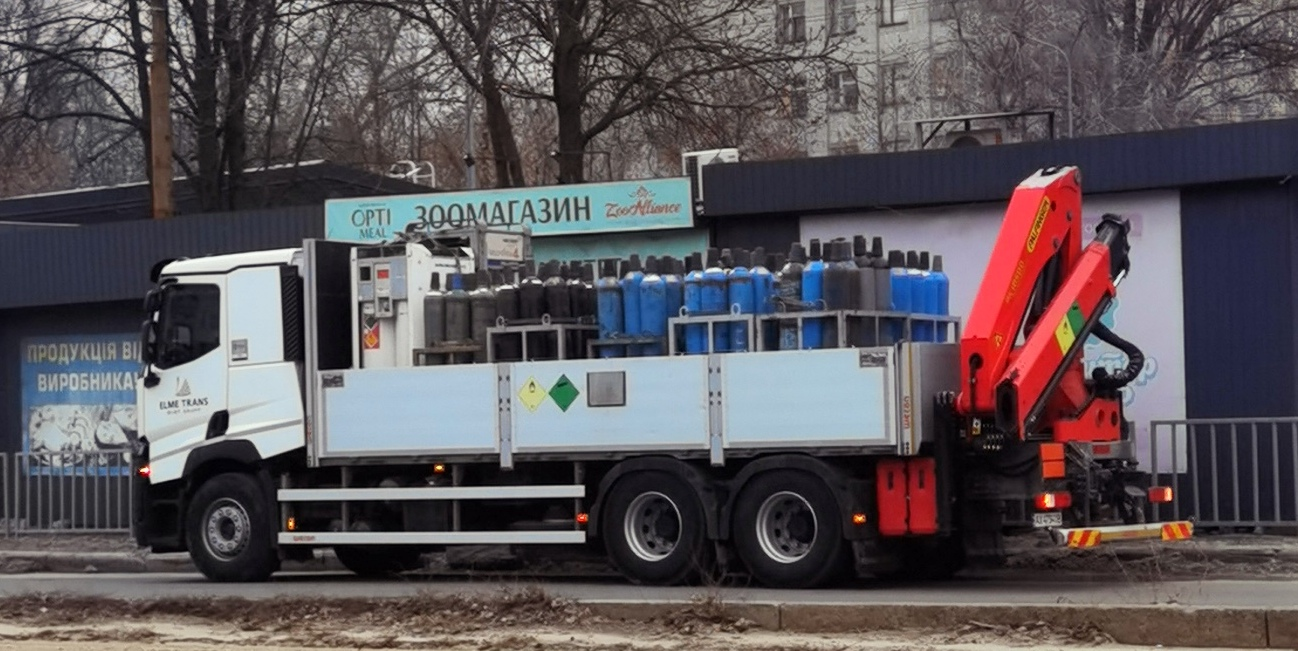
Transportation of oxygen gas cylinders in special truck in Dnipro, Ukraine.

Gas cylinders are classified by the UN as dangerous goods for transportation purposes (US: Hazardous materials). Selecting the Proper Shipping Name (well known by the abbreviation PSN) is a way to help ensure that the dangerous goods offered for transport accurately represent the hazards.

IATA Dangerous Goods Regulations (DGR) 55th Edition defines the Proper Shipping Name as "the name to be used to describe a particular article or substance in all shipping documents and notifications and, where appropriate, on packagings".

The International Maritime Dangerous Goods Code (IMDG Code) defines the Proper Shipping Name as "that portion of the entry most accurately describing the goods in the Dangerous Goods List which is shown in upper-case characters (plus any letters which form an integral part of the name)."

Diving gas cylinders:

Hazardous materials descriptions and proper shipping names (PSN)	Hazard class or division	Identification numbers	Label codes	Quantity limitations
Air, compressed	2.2	UN1002	2.2	Passenger aircraft/rail: 75 kg Cargo aircraft only: 150 kg
Argon, compressed	2.2	UN1006	2.2	Passenger aircraft/rail: 75 kg Cargo aircraft only: 150 kg
Helium, compressed	2.2	UN1046	2.2	Passenger aircraft/rail: 75 kg Cargo aircraft only: 150 kg
Nitrogen, compressed	2.2	UN1066	2.2	Passenger aircraft/rail: 75 kg Cargo aircraft only: 150 kg
Oxygen, compressed	2.2	UN1072	2.2, 5.1	Passenger aircraft/rail: 75 kg Cargo aircraft only: 150 kg
Compressed gas N.O.S. (not otherwise specified) e.g. normoxic and hypoxic Heliox and Trimix	2.2	UN1956	2.2	Passenger aircraft/rail: 75 kg Cargo aircraft only: 150 kg
Compressed gas, oxidising, N.O.S e.g. Nitrox	2.2	UN3156	2.2, 5.1	Passenger aircraft/rail: 75 kg Cargo aircraft only: 150 kg

==== International air ====
International Civil Aviation Organization (ICAO) Technical Instructions for the Safe Transport of Dangerous Goods by Air states that provided that pressure in diving cylinders is less than 200 kilopascals (2 bar; 29 psi), these can be carried as checked in or carry-on baggage. It maybe necessary to empty the cylinder to verify this. Once emptied, the cylinder valve should be closed to prevent moisture entering the cylinder. Security restrictions implemented by individual countries may further limit or forbid the carriage of some items permitted by ICAO, and airlines and security screening agencies have the right to refuse the carriage of certain items.

==== Europe ====
Since 1996 the carriage of dangerous goods legislation of the UK has been harmonized with that of Europe.

Road transport

The 2009 (amended 2011) UK Carriage of Dangerous Goods and Use of Transportable Pressure Equipment Regulations (CDG Regulations) implement the European Agreement Concerning the International Carriage of Dangerous Goods by Road (ADR). Dangerous goods to be carried internationally in road vehicles must comply with standards for the packaging and labelling of the dangerous goods, and appropriate construction and operating standards for the vehicles and crew.

The regulations cover transportation of gas cylinders in a vehicle in a commercial environment. Transportation of pressurised diving gas cylinders with a combined water capacity of less than 1000 litres on a vehicle for personal use is exempt from ADR.

Transport of gas cylinders in a vehicle, for commercial purposes, must follow basic legal safety requirements and, unless specifically exempted, must comply with ADR. The driver of the vehicle is legally responsible for the safety of the vehicle and any load being carried, and insurance for the vehicle should include cover for the carriage of dangerous goods.

Diving gases, including compressed air, oxygen, nitrox, heliox, trimix, helium and argon, are non-toxic, non flammable, and may be oxidizer or asphyxiant, and are rated in Transport category 3. The threshold quantity for these gases is 1000 litres combined water capacity of the cylinders. Pressure must be within the rated working pressure of the cylinder. Empty air cylinders at atmospheric pressure are rated in Transport category 4, and there is no threshold quantity.

Commercial loads below the 1000 litres threshold level are exempt from some of the requirements of ADR, but must comply with basic legal and safety requirements, including:

- Driver training
- Cylinders should be transported in open vehicles, open containers or trailers, with a gas-tight bulkhead separating driver from load. If cylinders must be carried inside a vehicle it must be well ventilated.
- Ventilation. Where gas cylinders are carried inside a vehicle, in the same space as people, the windows should be kept open to allow air to circulate.
- Cylinders must be secured so that they cannot move during transport. They shall not project beyond the sides or ends of the vehicle. It is recommended that cylinders are transported vertically, secured in an appropriate pallet.
- Cylinder valves must be closed whilst in transit and checked that there are no leaks. Where applicable, protective valve caps and covers should be fitted to cylinders before transporting. Cylinders should not be transported with equipment attached to the valve outlet (regulators, hoses etc.).
- A fire extinguisher is required on the vehicle.
- Gas cylinders may only be transported if they are in-date for periodic inspection and test, except they may be transported when out of date for inspection, testing or disposal.
- Cylinders should be kept cool (at ambient temperatures) and not stowed in places where they will be exposed to sources of excessive heat.
- Product identification labels attached to cylinders to identify the contents and provide safety advice must not be removed or defaced.
- It is not necessary to mark and label the vehicle if carrying dangerous goods below the threshold level. The use of hazard labels can assist the emergency services, and they may be displayed, but all hazard labels must be removed when the relevant dangerous goods are not being transported.
- When the journey is complete the gas cylinders should be immediately unloaded from the vehicle.

All loads above the threshold must comply with the full requirements of ADR.

==== United States ====
Transportation of hazardous materials for commercial purposes in the USA is regulated by Code of Federal Regulations Title 49 - Transportation, (abbreviated 49 CFR). A cylinder containing 200 kPa (29.0 psig/43.8 psia) or greater at 20 °C (68 °F) of non-flammable, nonpoisonous compressed gas, and being transported for commercial purposes is classified as HAZMAT (hazardous materials) in terms of 49 CFR 173.115(b) (1). Cylinders manufactured to DOT standards or special permits (exemptions)issued by the Pipeline and Hazardous Materials Safety Administration and filled to the authorized working pressure are legal for commercial transport in the USA under the provisions and conditions of the regulations. Cylinders manufactured outside the USA may be transported under a special permit, and these have been issued for solid metal and composite cylinders with working pressures of up to 300 bar (4400 psi) by several manufacturers.

Commercial transportation of breathing gas cylinders with a combined weight of more than 1000 pounds may only be done by a commercial HAZMAT transportation company. Transport of cylinders with a combined weight of less than 1000 pounds requires a manifest, the cylinders must have been tested and inspected to federal standards, and the contents marked on each cylinder. Transportation must be done in a safe manner, with the cylinders restrained from movement. No special licence is required. DOT regulations require content labels for all cylinders under the regulations, but according to PSI, labelling of breathing air will not be enforced. Oxygen or non-air oxidizing (O_{2} ≥ 23.5% ) mixtures must be labelled. Private (non-commercial) transport of scuba cylinders is not covered by this regulation.

Empty scuba tanks or scuba tanks pressurized at less than 200 kPa are not restricted as hazardous materials. Scuba cylinders are only allowed in checked baggage or as a carry-on if the cylinder valve is completely disconnected from the cylinder and the cylinder has an open end to allow for a visual inspection inside.

=== Color coding ===
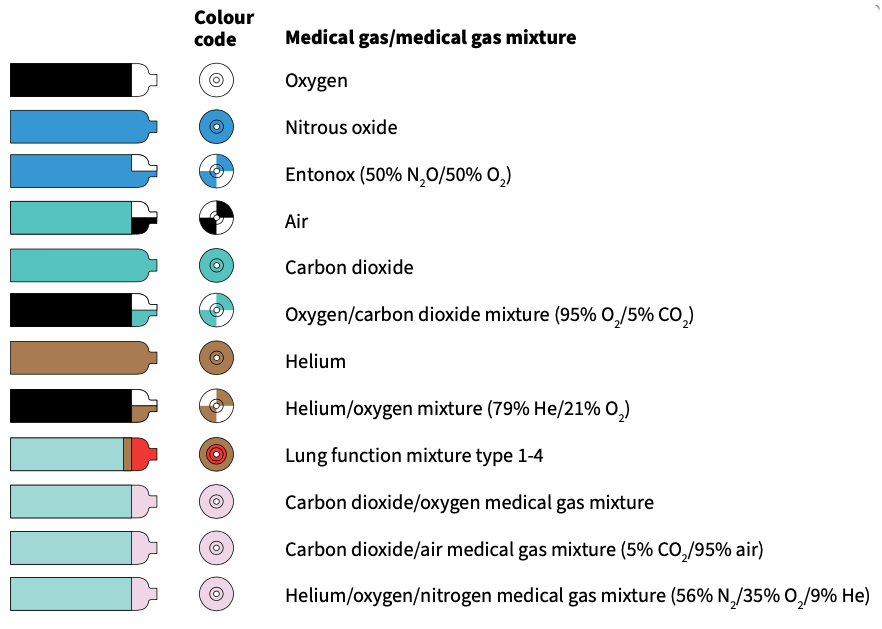
ISO Cylinder Colour Coding for Different (medical) Gases

Gas cylinders are often color-coded, but the codes are not standard across different jurisdictions, and sometimes are not regulated. Cylinder color can not safely be used for positive product identification; cylinders have labels to identify the gas they contain.

==== Medical gas cylinder color code Indian standard ====
The Indian Standard for Gas Cylinder Color Code applies to the identification of the contents of gas cylinders intended for medical use. Each cylinder shall be painted externally in the colours corresponding to its gaseous contents.

=== Permanent markings ===
The shoulder of the cylinder carries stamp markings providing required information about the cylinder.

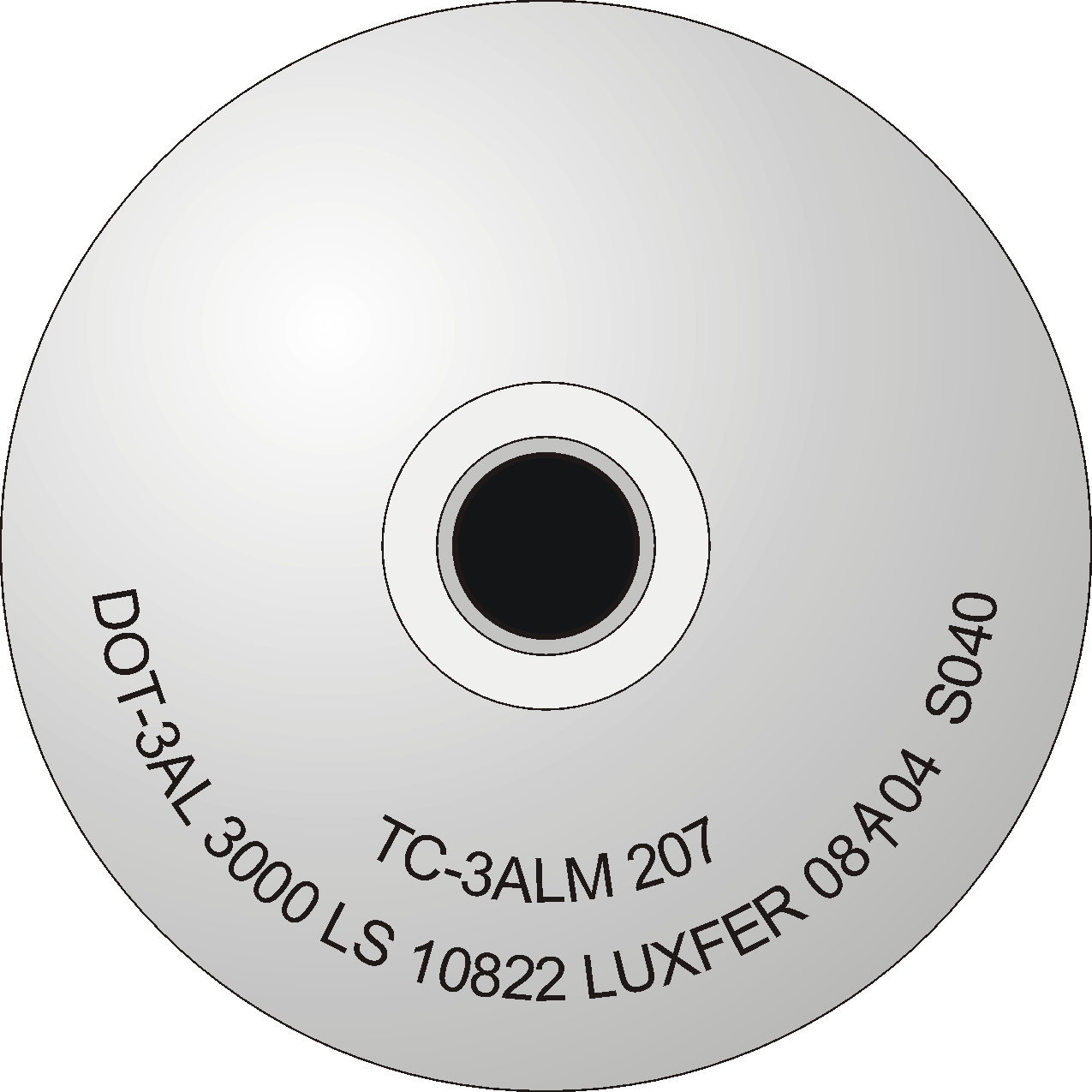
Stamp markings on an American manufacture aluminum 40 cu ft 3000 psi cylinder

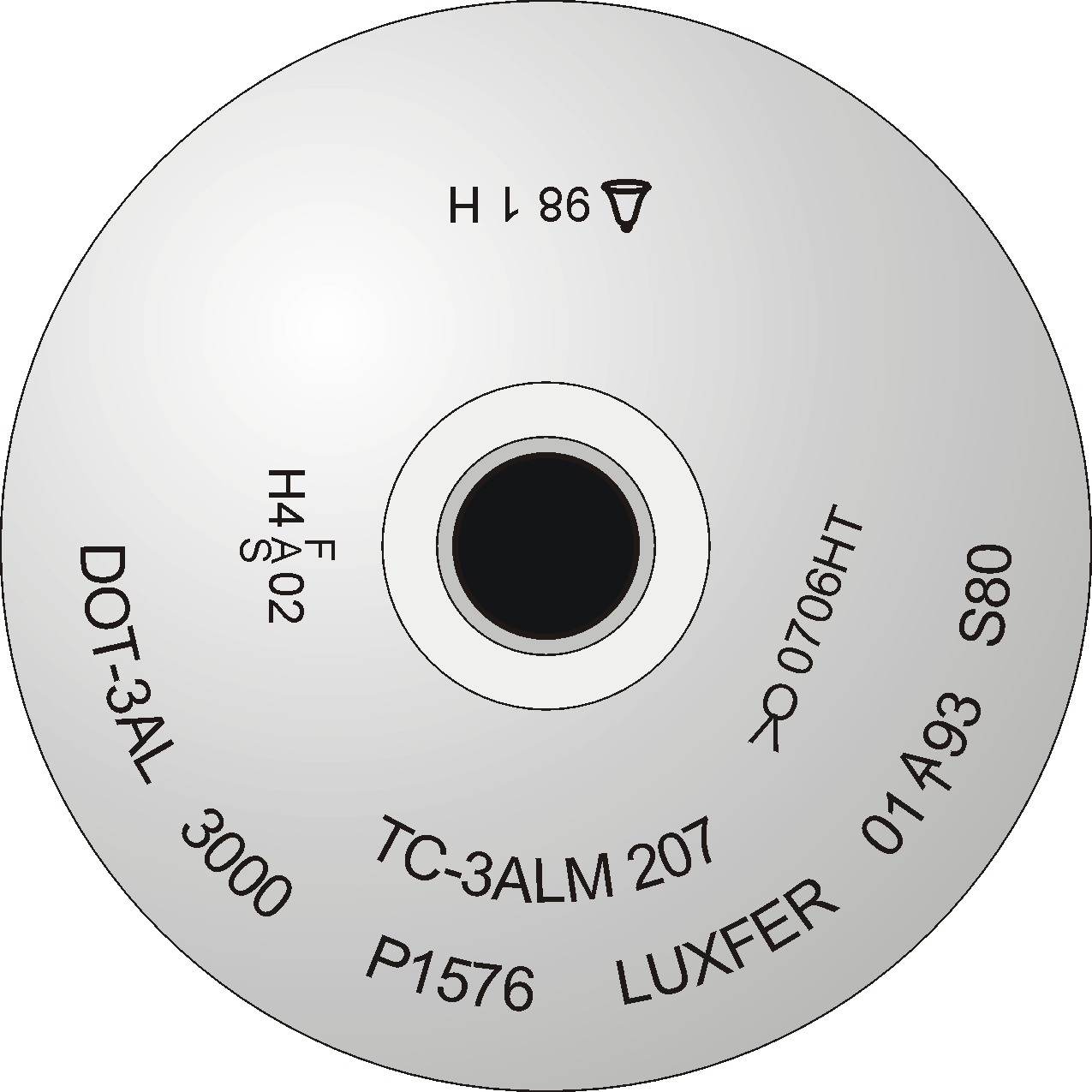
Stamp markings on an American manufacture aluminum 80 cu ft 3000 psi cylinder

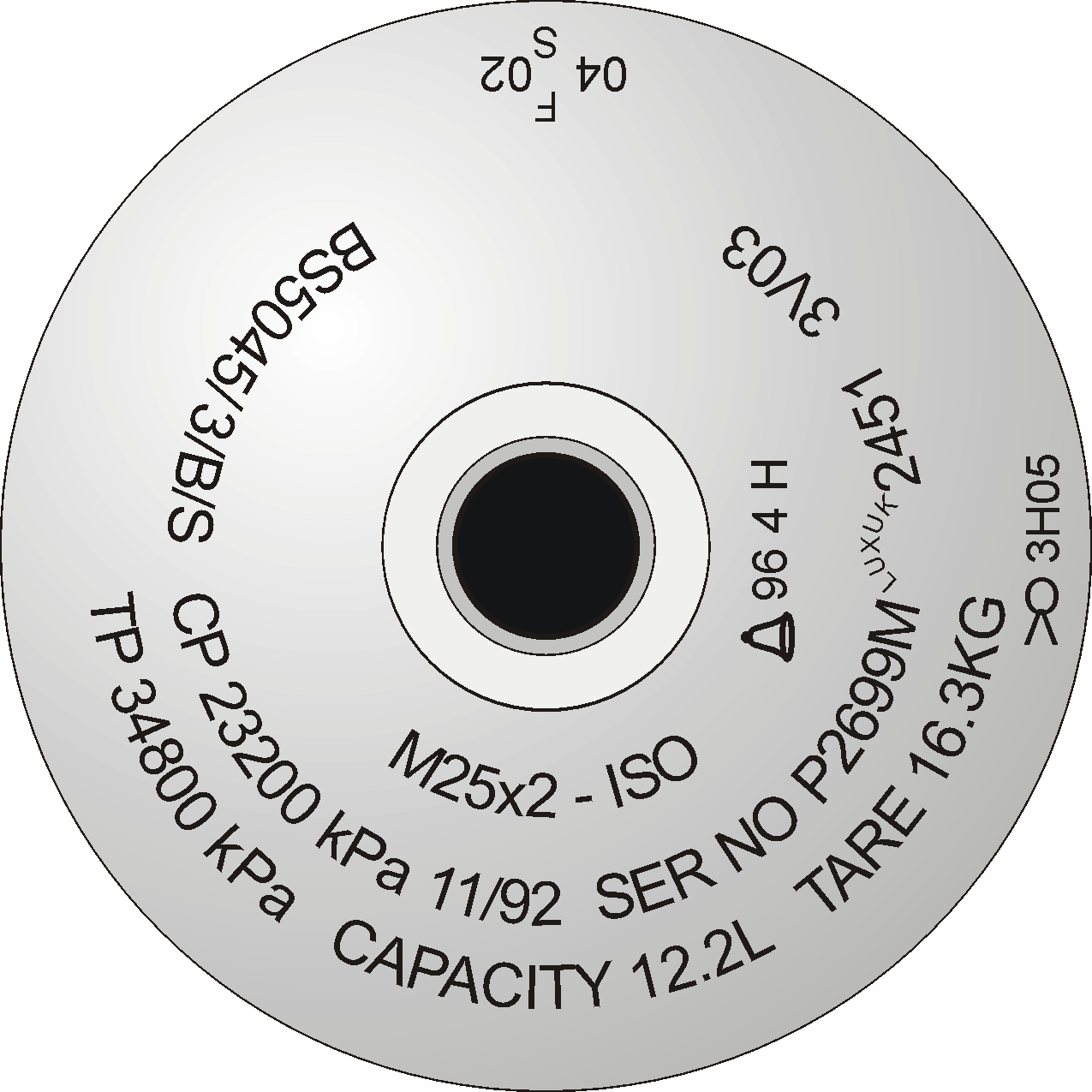
Stamp markings on a British-manufacture aluminium 12.2-litre 232-bar cylinder

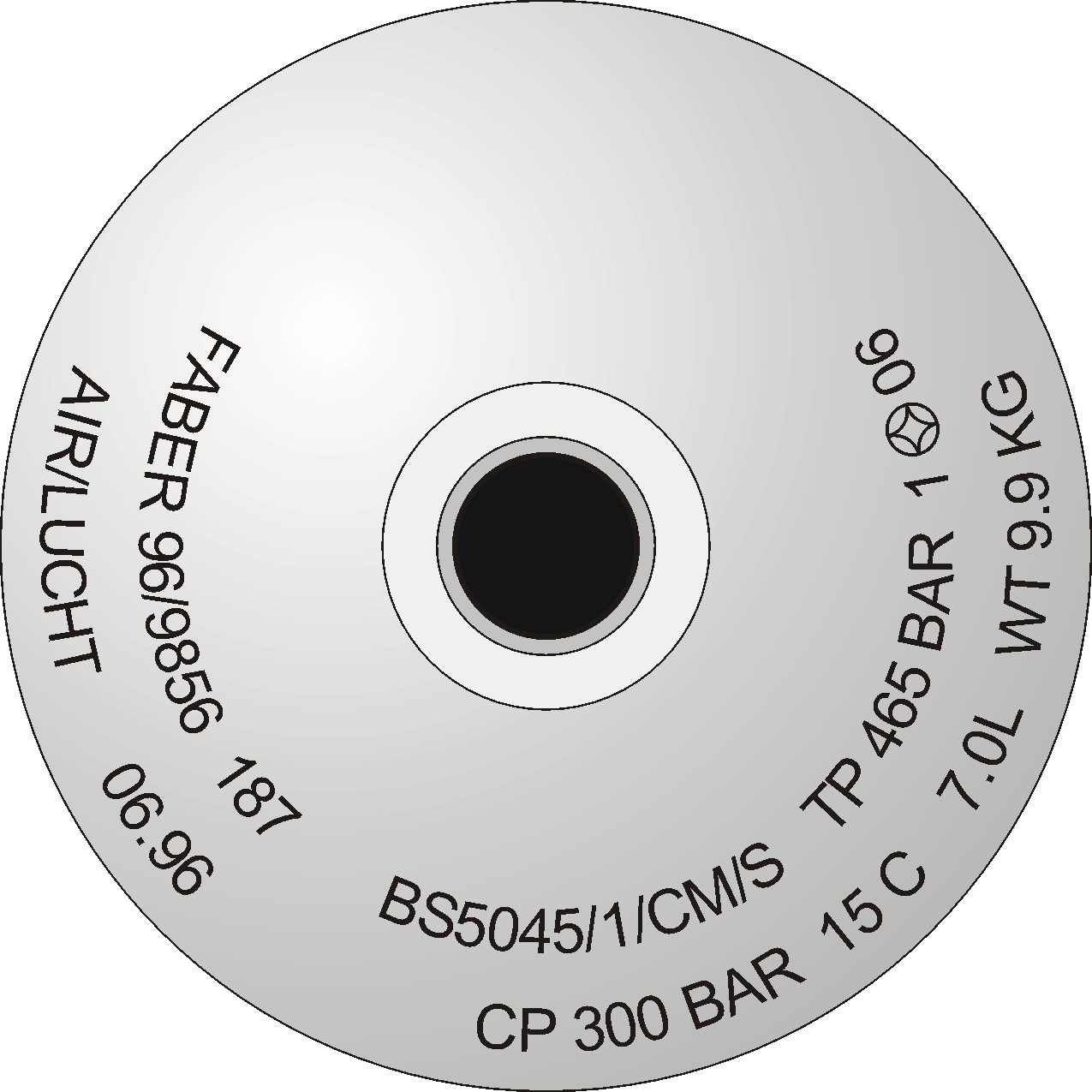
Stamp markings on an Italian manufacture steel 7-litre 300-bar cylinder

Universally required markings include:

- Identification of the manufacturer
- Manufacturing standard, which will identify the material specification
- Serial number
- Date of manufacture
- Charging pressure
- Capacity
- Mark of the accredited testing agency
- Date of each re-validation test

A variety of other markings may be required by national regulations, or may be optional.

== Filling ==
Diving cylinders are filled by attaching a high-pressure gas supply to the cylinder valve, opening the valve and allowing gas to flow into the cylinder until the desired pressure is reached, then closing the valves, venting the connection and disconnecting it. This process involves a risk of the cylinder or the filling equipment failing under pressure, both of which are hazardous to the operator, so procedures to control these risks are generally followed. Rate of filling must be limited to avoid excessive heating, the temperature of cylinder and contents must remain below the maximum working temperature specified by the applicable standard.

=== Filling by pressure ===
For permanent gases, a cylinder can be filled to the charging pressure, or any lesser pressure that may be appropriate. This generally requires correction to account for temperature changes during filling, and variation from the reference temperature (usually 15 or 20°C).

==== Charging pressure ====
Charging pressure is the maximum gauge pressure allowed during filling of a pressure vessel when corrected to the reference temperature. The charging pressure is permanently marked on the cylinder.

=== Filling by mass ===
Filling by mass does not need correction or adjustment for temperature, and is the standard method for filling liquefied gases, as the pressure of a vapour over liquid is determined by the temperature, making it an unreliable indicator of the amount of liquefied gas in the cylinder. The process requires the added mass to be measured accurately, and the scale to be zeroed according to the mass of the empty cylinder.

== Common sizes ==
The below are example cylinder sizes and do not constitute an industry standard.

Cyl. size	Diameter × height, including 5.5 inches for valve and cap (inches)	Nominal tare weight, including 4.5 lb for valve and cap (lb)	Water capacity (lb)	Internal volume, 70 °F (21 °C), 1 atm		U.S. DOT specs
Cyl. size	Diameter × height, including 5.5 inches for valve and cap (inches)	Nominal tare weight, including 4.5 lb for valve and cap (lb)	Water capacity (lb)	(liters)	(cu. ft)	U.S. DOT specs
2HP	9 by 51 inches (230 mm × 1,300 mm)	187 pounds (85 kg)	95.5	43.3	1.53	3AA3500
K	9.25 by 60 inches (235 mm × 1,524 mm)	135 pounds (61 kg)	110	49.9	1.76	3AA2400
A	9 by 51 inches (230 mm × 1,300 mm)	115 pounds (52 kg)	96	43.8	1.55	3AA2015
B	8.5 by 31 inches (220 mm × 790 mm)	60 pounds (27 kg)	37.9	17.2	0.61	3AA2015
C	6 by 24 inches (150 mm × 610 mm)	27 pounds (12 kg)	15.2	6.88	0.24	3AA2015
D	4 by 18 inches (100 mm × 460 mm)	12 pounds (5.4 kg)	4.9	2.24	0.08	3AA2015
AL	8 by 53 inches (200 mm × 1,350 mm)	52 pounds (24 kg)	64.8	29.5	1.04	3AL2015
BL	7.25 by 39 inches (184 mm × 991 mm)	33 pounds (15 kg)	34.6	15.7	0.55	3AL2216
CL	6.9 by 21 inches (180 mm × 530 mm)	19 pounds (8.6 kg)	13	5.9	0.21	3AL2216
XL	14.5 by 50 inches (370 mm × 1,270 mm)	75 pounds (34 kg)	238	108	3.83	4BA240
SSB	8 by 37 inches (200 mm × 940 mm)	95 pounds (43 kg)	41.6	18.9	0.67	3A1800
10S	4 by 31 inches (100 mm × 790 mm)	21 pounds (9.5 kg)	8.3	3.8	0.13	3A1800
LB	2 by 15 inches (51 mm × 381 mm)	4 pounds (1.8 kg)	1	0.44	0.016	3E1800
XF	12 by 46 inches (300 mm × 1,170 mm)	180 pounds (82 kg)	134.3	60.9	2.15	8AL
XG	15 by 56 inches (380 mm × 1,420 mm)	149 pounds (68 kg)	278	126.3	4.46	4AA480
XM	10 by 49 inches (250 mm × 1,240 mm)	90 pounds (41 kg)	120	54.3	1.92	3A480
XP	10 by 55 inches (250 mm × 1,400 mm)	55 pounds (25 kg)	124	55.7	1.98	4BA300
QT	3 by 14 inches (76 mm × 356 mm) (includes 4.5 inches for valve)	2.5 pounds (1.1 kg) (includes 1.5 lb for valve)	2.0	0.900	0.0318	4B-240ET
LP5	12.25 by 18.25 inches (311 mm × 464 mm)	18.5 pounds (8.4 kg)	47.7	21.68	0.76	4BW240
Medical E	4 by 26 inches (100 mm × 660 mm) (excludes valve and cap)	14 pounds (6.4 kg) (excludes valve and cap)	9.9	4.5	0.16	3AA2015

(US DOT specs define material, making, and maximum pressure in psi. They are comparable to Transport Canada specs, which shows pressure in bars. A 3E-1800 in DOT nomenclature would be a TC 3EM 124 in Canada.)

== Gas storage tubes ==
For larger volume, high pressure gas storage units, known as tubes, are available. They generally have a larger diameter and length than high pressure cylinders, and usually have a tapped neck at both ends. They may be mounted alone or in groups on trailers, permanent bases, or intermodal transport frames. Due to their length, they are mounted horizontally on mobile structures. In general usage they are often manifolded together and managed as a unit.

== Gas storage banks ==
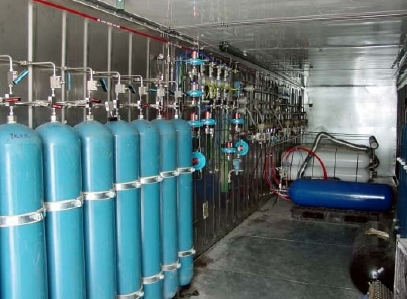
Hydrogen storage cylinders in a cascade filling system

Groups of similar size cylinders may be mounted together and connected to a common manifold system to provide larger storage capacity than a single standard cylinder. This is commonly called a cylinder bank or a gas storage bank. The manifold may be arranged to allow simultaneous flow from all the cylinders, or, for a cascade filling system, where gas is tapped off cylinders according to the lowest positive pressure difference between storage and destination cylinder, being a more efficient use of pressurised gas.

=== Gas storage quads ===
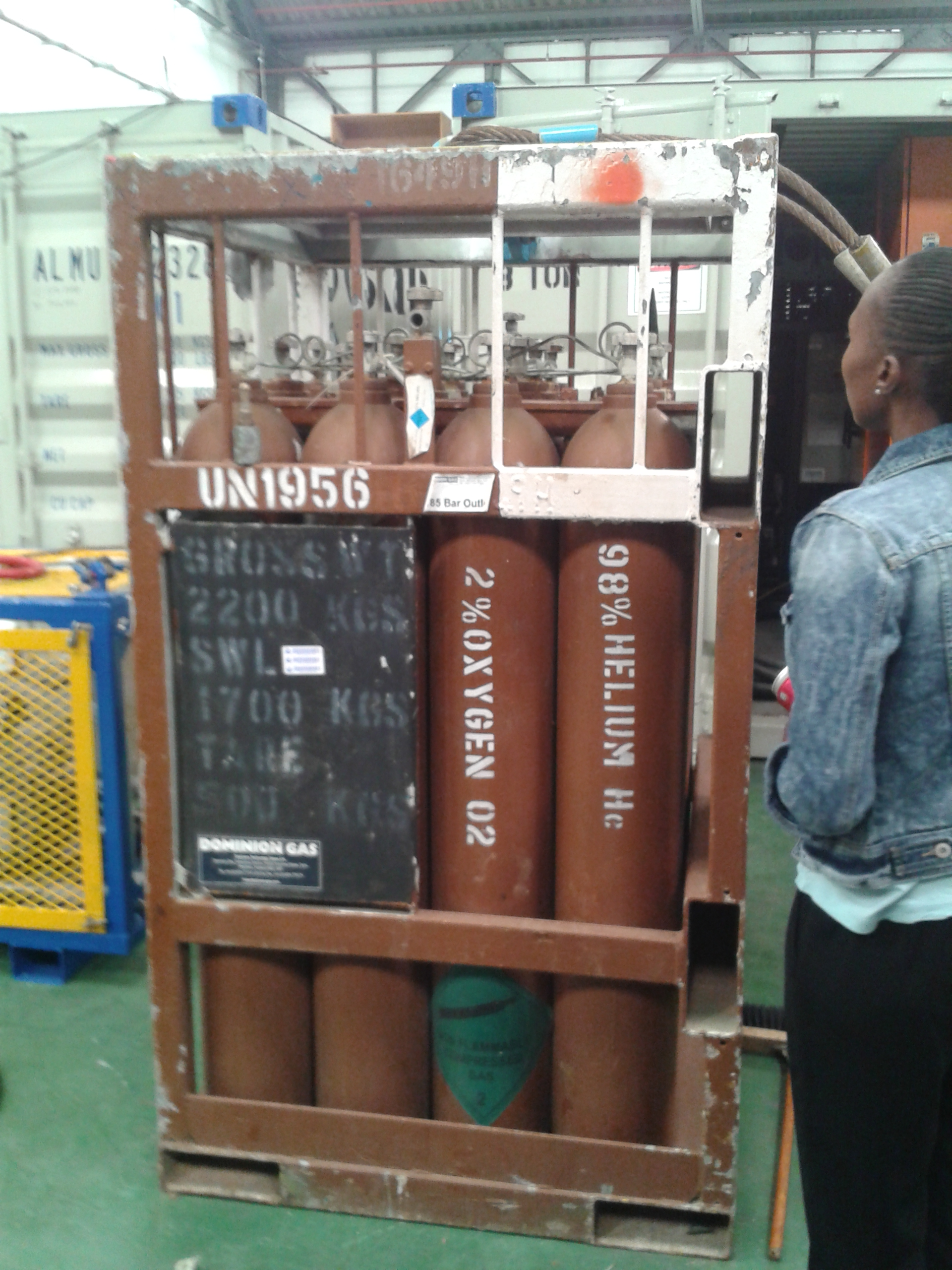
Helium quad for surface-supplied diving gas

A gas cylinder quad, also known as a gas cylinder bundle, is a group of high pressure cylinders mounted on a transport and storage frame. There are commonly 16 cylinders, each of about 50 litres capacity mounted upright in four rows of four, on a square base with a square plan frame with lifting points on top and may have fork-lift slots in the base. The cylinders are usually interconnected by a manifold for use as a unit, but many variations in layout and structure are possible.

== See also ==
- Bottled gas – Gas compressed and stored in cylinders
- Composite overwrapped pressure vessel – Pressure vessel with a non-structural liner wrapped with a structural fiber composite
- Diving cylinder – Container to supply high pressure gas for diving operations
- Filling carousel – Device for filling liquefied petroleum gas cylinders
- Kelly (gas storage) – Large volume high pressure gas storage tubes
- Lecture bottle – Small gas cylinder typically used for specialty gasses
- Powerlet – A small, inexpensive, disposable metal gas cylinder for providing pneumatic power
- Scuba set – Self-contained underwater breathing apparatus
- Storage tank – Container for liquids or compressed gas
- UN Recommendations on the Transport of Dangerous Goods – United Nations Model Regulations

== Sources ==
- NOAA Diving Program (U.S.) (28 February 2001). Joiner, James T (ed.). NOAA Diving Manual, Diving for Science and Technology (4th ed.). Silver Spring, Maryland: National Oceanic and Atmospheric Administration, Office of Oceanic and Atmospheric Research, National Undersea Research Program. ISBN 978-0-941332-70-5. CD-ROM prepared and distributed by the National Technical Information Service (NTIS)in partnership with NOAA and Best Publishing Company
