= Filling carousel =

Device for filling liquefied petroleum gas cylinders

A filling carousel is a machine for filling large numbers of liquefied petroleum gas (LPG) cylinders from bulk storage. It consists of a frame with running wheels, rails, a central column for LPG and air, and a driving unit rotating the carousel frame around the central column. The speed of the carousel can be adapted to the various filling times and capacities. The dimension of the carousel is important to consider for the future filling capacity. The carousel frame chosen can be equipped with a number of filling scales, suited for the current demand and possible future demands. Filling carousels can be provided with equipment for automatic introduction and automatic filling scales with ejection of cylinders.

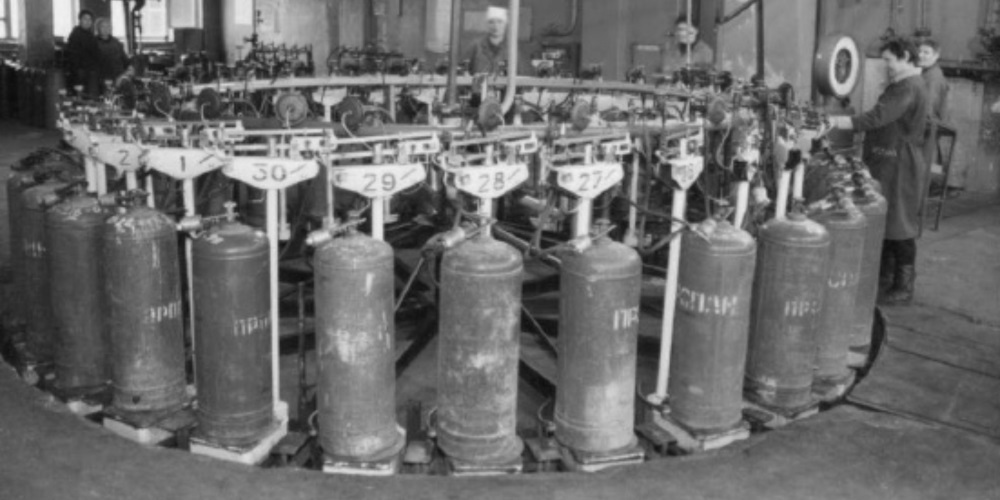
Filling carousel at Pushkinskaya GRS, near Moscow, around 1974

== Dimensions ==
Frame sizes and approximate filling times for 12 kg cylinders with two-man operation:

| Carousel type | Net weight of cylinder | Capacity Cylinders per hour |
|---|---|---|
| 12 scales, dia 4350mm | 12 kg | 720 |
| 24 scales, dia 5500mm | 12 kg | 1200 |

== Associated equipment ==
| Device | Description |
|---|---|
| Automatic inlet device | Controls the transfer of LPG cylinders from the inlet portion of the conveyor system into the carousel. It is an integral part of an automated cylinder filling operation. |
| Chain conveyor | The main purpose of the double chain conveyor is to carry the LPG cylinders to and from the filling carousel. It has a sturdy steel construction and is one of the most important components of an automated LPG filling operation. Good conveyor layout saves time, space and labor. |
| Carousel drive unit | Consists of an explosion-proof electric motor, a hydraulic pump and a hydraulic motor to drive the rubber wheel that turns the carousel. |
| Conveyor drive unit | Consists of an explosion-proof electric motor, a gear reducer and a chain-sprocket drive mechanism. |
| Ejection unit | Designed to take the filled cylinder from the carousel. The ejection unit typically receives a signal from the corresponding filling head (filling head is up) indicating that the cylinder is filled and may be taken off the carousel. If the filling is not completed, "filling head down" tells the evacuation unit not to activate and the cylinder completes one more cycle on the carousel while being filled. On modern carousels these commands are electronic, but can also be mechanical by means of a dowel which operates a switch. |
| Pressure control valve | A very important instrument in cylinder filling. It allows LPG in pipeline to be at a predetermined pressure. When the pressure exceeds this value the valve opens and sends the flow to return line. |

== How it works ==
LPG cylinders of a consistent size mass, and design are loaded onto the feed conveyor from incoming trucks. They may pass through an automatic washer and a check scale before being loaded onto the carousel at a filling point. A filling nozzle is automatically connected to the valve opening. Each filling point is equipped with an electronic scale to measure the mass of the cylinder while it is being filled, and to stop the flow when it is full. The rotation speed of the carousel will normally allow an empty cylinder to be filled and the filling nozzle automatically disconnected by the time it reaches the ejection point where it is pushed onto the discharge conveyor. The filled cylinder may pass through an automatic check scale, an automated leak detector, and valve cover heat shrink wrap applicator before it is carried to the outgoing truck for loading.

A spray-painting station may be provided to repair damaged paintwork.
