= Flammable liquid =

Liquid that can catch fire

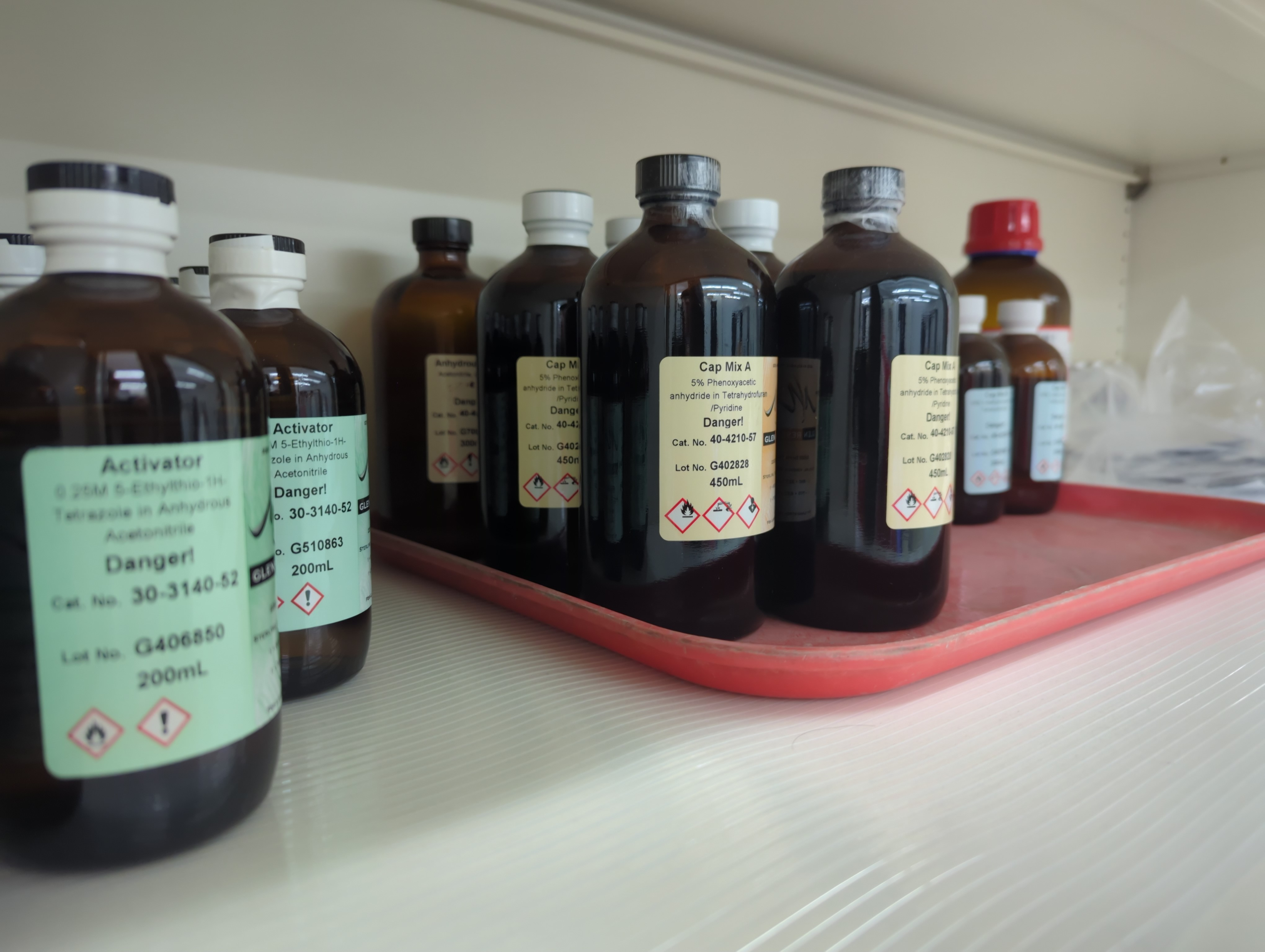
Flammable liquids in bottles on a shelf

A flammable liquid is a liquid which can be easily ignited in air at ambient temperatures, i.e. it has a flash point at or below nominal threshold temperatures defined by a number of national and international standards organisations.

The Occupational Safety and Health Administration (OSHA) of the United States Department of Labor defines a liquid as flammable if it has a flash point at or below 93 °C (199.4 °F). Prior to bringing regulations in line with the United Nations Globally Harmonized System of Classification and Labeling of Chemicals (GHS) in 2012, OSHA considered flammable liquids to be those with a flash point below 37.8 °C (100.0 °F). Those with flash points above 37.8 °C/100 °F and below 93.3 °C (199.9 °F) were classified as combustible liquids. Studies show that the actual measure of a liquid's flammability, its flash point, is dependent on the local air pressure, meaning that at higher altitudes where the air pressure is lower, the flash point is also lower.

== Categorization ==
The international pictogram for flammable chemicals

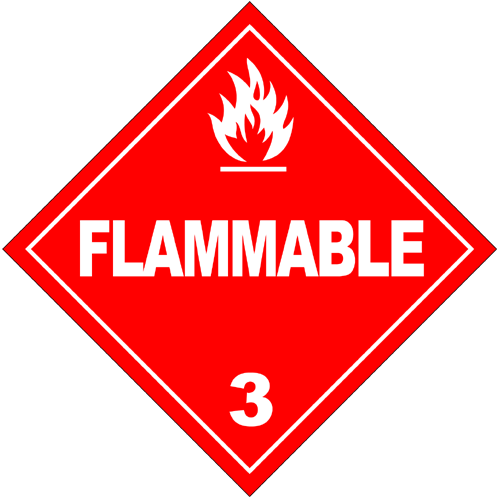
Flammable placard designated by the United States Department of Transportation

Both OSHA and GHS further divide flammable liquids into 4 categories:

- Category I flammable liquids are those with boiling points ≤ 35 °C (95 °F) and flash points < 23 °C (73 °F)
- Category II flammable liquids are those with boiling points > 35 °C/95 °F and flash points < 23 °C/73 °F
- Category III flammable liquids are those with flash points > 23 °C (73 °F) and ≤ 60 °C (140 °F)
- Category IV flammable liquids are those with flash points > 60 °C/140 °F and ≤ 93 °C/199.4 °F

These categorizations are dependent upon a set altitude and atmospheric pressure, as both boiling point and flash point change with changes in pressure.

== Labeling ==
Both GHS and OSHA require the labeling of flammable liquids, on containers and safety data sheets, as follows:

| | Category I | Category II | Category III | Category IV |
|---|---|---|---|---|
| Symbol | Flame | Flame | Flame | none |
| Signal Word | Danger | Danger | Warning | Warning |
| Hazard Statement | Extremely flammable liquid and vapour | Highly flammable liquid and vapor | Flammable liquid and vapour | Combustible liquid |

== See also ==
- Fire prevention
- Fire protection
- Combustibility and flammability
- Pyrophoricity
- List of R-phrases
