= Anaesthetic machine =

Medical device to supply a mix of life-support and anaesthetic gases

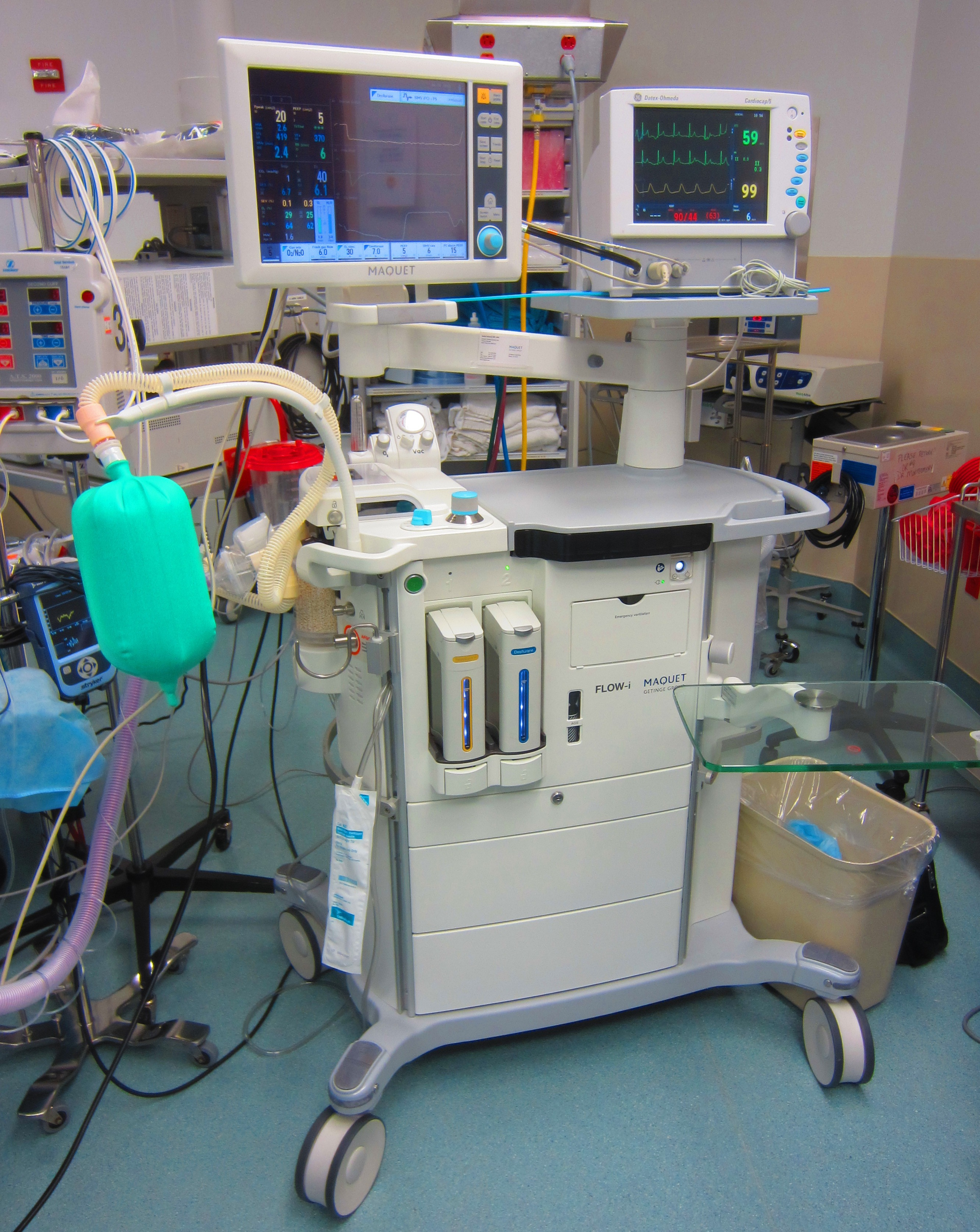
- An anaesthetic machine. This particular machine is a "Flow-I" model, manufactured by Maquet, a division of Getinge Group, Getinge, Sweden.
- Process type: physical change
- Industrial sector(s): anaesthesiology (medicine)
- Main technologies or sub-processes: vaporization
- Feedstock: inhalational anaesthetic agents, chiefly nitrous oxide and volatile anaesthetics
- Product(s): phase transition of feedstock from the liquid phase to the gas phase
- Main facilities: hospitals and outpatient surgery centres

An anaesthetic machine (British English) or anesthesia machine (American English) is a medical device used to generate and mix a fresh gas flow of medical gases and inhalational anaesthetic agents for the purpose of inducing and maintaining anaesthesia.

The machine is commonly used together with a mechanical ventilator, breathing system, suction equipment, and patient monitoring devices; strictly speaking, the term "anaesthetic machine" refers only to the component which generates the gas flow, but modern machines usually integrate all these devices into one combined freestanding unit, which is colloquially referred to as the "anaesthetic machine" for the sake of simplicity. In the developed world, the most frequent type in use is the continuous-flow anaesthetic machine or "Boyle's machine", which is designed to provide an accurate supply of medical gases mixed with an accurate concentration of anaesthetic vapour, and to deliver this continuously to the patient at a safe pressure and flow. This is distinct from intermittent-flow anaesthetic machines, which provide gas flow only on demand when triggered by the patient's own inspiration.

Simpler anaesthetic apparatus may be used in special circumstances, such as the triservice anaesthetic apparatus, a simplified anaesthesia delivery system invented for the British Defence Medical Services, which is light and portable and may be used for ventilation even when no medical gases are available. This device has unidirectional valves which suck in ambient air, which can be enriched with oxygen from a cylinder, with the help of a set of bellows.

== History ==
The original concept of continuous-flow machines was popularised by Boyle's anaesthetic machine, invented by the British anaesthetist Henry Boyle at St Bartholomew's Hospital in London, United Kingdom, in 1917, although similar machines had been in use in France and the United States. Prior to this time, anaesthesiologists often carried all their equipment with them, but the development of heavy, bulky cylinder storage and increasingly elaborate airway equipment meant that this was no longer practical for most circumstances. Contemporary anaesthetic machines are sometimes still referred to metonymously as "Boyle's machine", and are usually mounted on anti-static wheels for convenient transportation.

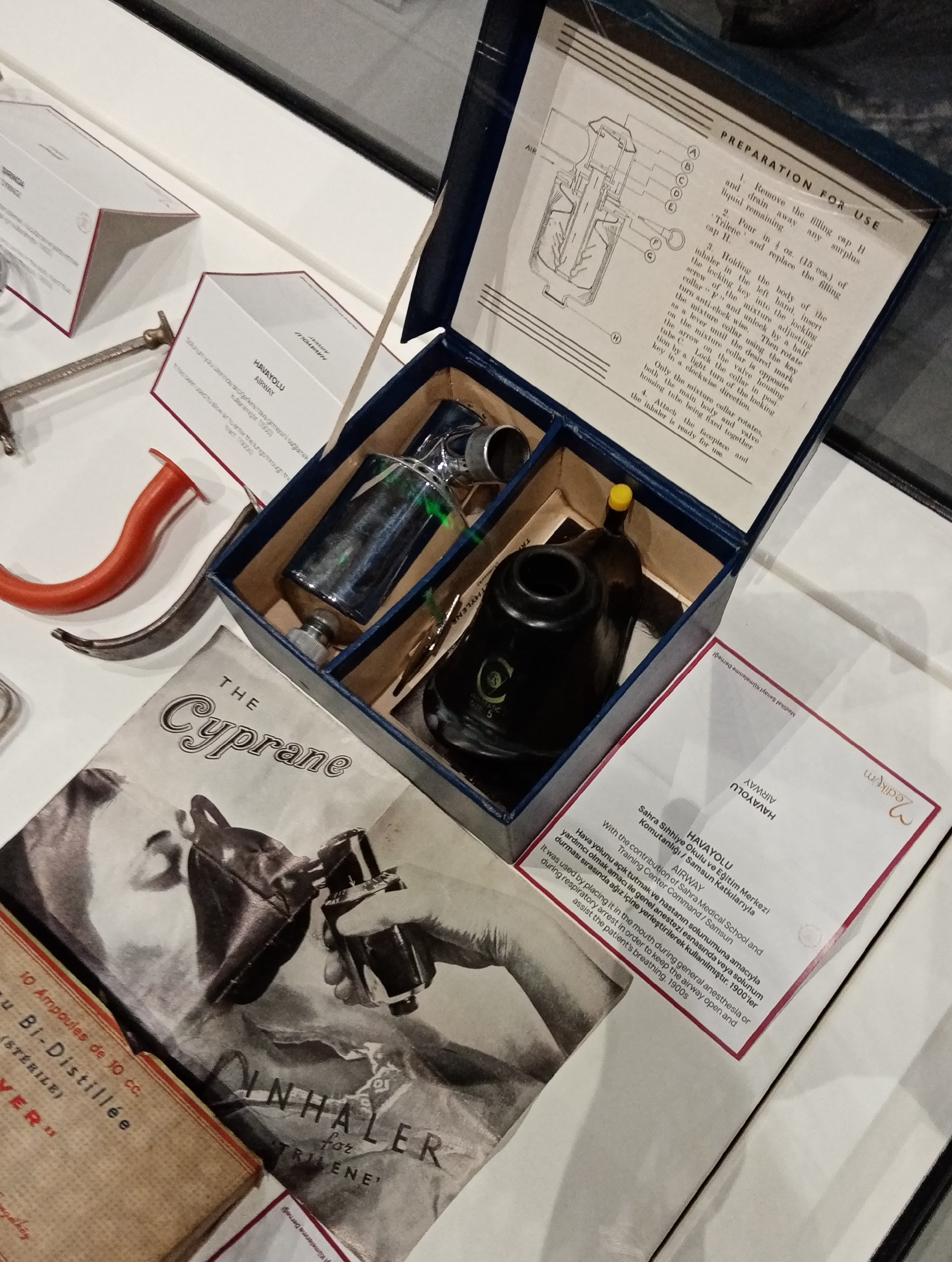
Handheld anaesthetic device for trichloroethylene, made in the UK, 1947. This device was designed for self-administration by the patient.

Many of the early innovations in anaesthetic equipment in the United States, including the closed circuit carbon-dioxide absorber (a.k.a. the Guedel-Foregger Midget) and diffusion of such equipment to anaesthesiologists within the United States can be attributed to Richard von Foregger and The Foregger Company.

== Flow rate ==
In anaesthesia, fresh gas flow is the mixture of medical gases and volatile anaesthetic agents which is produced by an anaesthetic machine and has not been recirculated. The flow rate and composition of the fresh gas flow is determined by the anaesthetist. Typically the fresh gas flow emerges from the common gas outlet, a specific outlet on the anaesthetic machine to which the breathing attachment is connected.

Open circuit forms of equipment, such as the Magill attachment, require high fresh gas flows (e.g. 7 litres/min) to prevent the patient from rebreathing their own expired carbon dioxide. Recirculating (rebreather) systems, use soda lime to absorb carbon dioxide, in the scrubber, so that expired gas becomes suitable to re-use. With a very efficient recirculation system, the fresh gas flow may be reduced to the patient's minimum oxygen requirements (e.g. 250ml/min), plus a little volatile as needed to maintain the concentration of anaesthetic agent.

Increasing fresh gas flow to a recirculating breathing system can reduce carbon dioxide absorbent consumption. There is a cost/benefit trade-off between gas flow and use of adsorbent material when no inhalational anaesthetic agent is used which may have economic and environmental consequences.

- High flow anesthesia supplies fresh gas flow which approximates the patient’s minute ventilation, which is usually about 3 to 6 litres per minute in a normal adult.
- Low flow anesthesia supplies fresh gas flow of less than half the patient's minute ventilation of the patient, which is usually less than 3.0 litres per minute in a normal adult.
- Minimal flow anesthesia supplies fresh gas flow of about 0.5 litres per minute.
- Closed system anesthesia supplies fresh gas flow as needed to make up the recirculated gas volume to compensate for the patient’s need for oxygen and anesthetic agents.

== Anaesthetic vapouriser ==
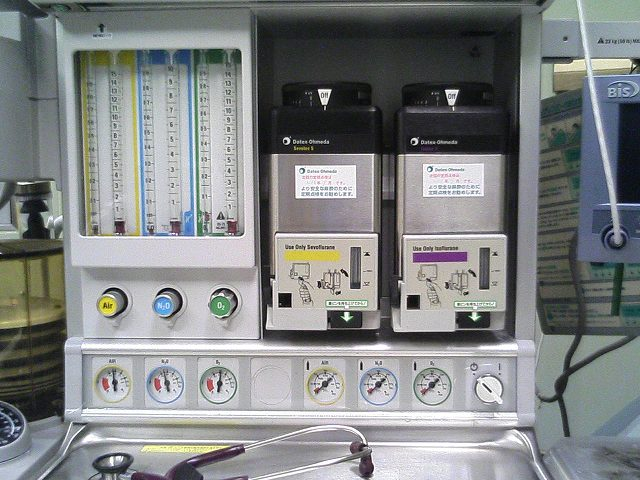
Anesthetic machine, showing sevoflurane (yellow) and isoflurane (purple) vaporizers on the right

An anesthetic vaporizer (American English) or anaesthetic vapouriser (British English) is a device generally attached to an anesthetic machine which delivers a given concentration of a volatile anesthetic agent. It works by controlling the vaporization of anesthetic agents from liquid, and then accurately controlling the concentration in which these are added to the fresh gas flow. The design of these devices takes account of varying: ambient temperature, fresh gas flow, and agent vapor pressure. There are generally two types of vaporizers: plenum and drawover. Both have distinct advantages and disadvantages. The dual-circuit gas-vapor blender is a third type of vaporizer used exclusively for the agent desflurane.

=== Plenum vaporizers ===
The plenum vaporizer is driven by positive pressure from the anesthetic machine, and is usually mounted on the machine. The performance of the vaporizer does not change regardless of whether the patient is breathing spontaneously or is mechanically ventilated. The internal resistance of the vaporizer is usually high, but because the supply pressure is constant the vaporizer can be accurately calibrated to deliver a precise concentration of volatile anesthetic vapor over a wide range of fresh gas flows. The plenum vaporizer is an elegant device which works reliably, without external power, for many hundreds of hours of continuous use, and requires very little maintenance.

The plenum vaporizer works by accurately splitting the incoming gas into two streams. One of these streams passes straight through the vaporizer in the bypass channel. The other is diverted into the vaporizing chamber. Gas in the vaporizing chamber becomes fully saturated with volatile anesthetic vapor. This gas is then mixed with the gas in the bypass channel before leaving the vaporizer.

A typical volatile agent, isoflurane, has a saturated vapor pressure of 32kPa (about 1/3 of an atmosphere). This means that the gas mixture leaving the vaporizing chamber has a partial pressure of isoflurane of 32kPa. At sea-level (atmospheric pressure is about 101kPa), this equates conveniently to a concentration of 32%. However, the output of the vaporizer is typically set at 1–2%, which means that only a very small proportion of the fresh gas needs to be diverted through the vaporizing chamber (this proportion is known as the splitting ratio). It can also be seen that a plenum vaporizer can only work one way round: if it is connected in reverse, much larger volumes of gas enter the vaporizing chamber, and therefore potentially toxic or lethal concentrations of vapor may be delivered. (Technically, although the dial of the vaporizer is calibrated in volume percent (e.g. 2%), what it actually delivers is a partial pressure of anesthetic agent (e.g. 2kPa)).

The performance of the plenum vaporizer depends extensively on the saturated vapor pressure of the volatile agent. This is unique to each agent, so it follows that each agent must only be used in its own specific vaporizer. Several safety systems, such as the Fraser-Sweatman system, have been devised so that filling a plenum vaporizer with the wrong agent is extremely difficult. A mixture of two agents in a vaporizer could result in unpredictable performance from the vaporizer.

Saturated vapor pressure for any one agent varies with temperature, and plenum vaporizers are designed to operate within a specific temperature range. They have several features designed to compensate for temperature changes (especially cooling by evaporation). They often have a metal jacket weighing about 5 kg, which equilibrates with the temperature in the room and provides a source of heat. In addition, the entrance to the vaporizing chamber is controlled by a bimetallic strip, which admits more gas to the chamber as it cools, to compensate for the loss of efficiency of evaporation.

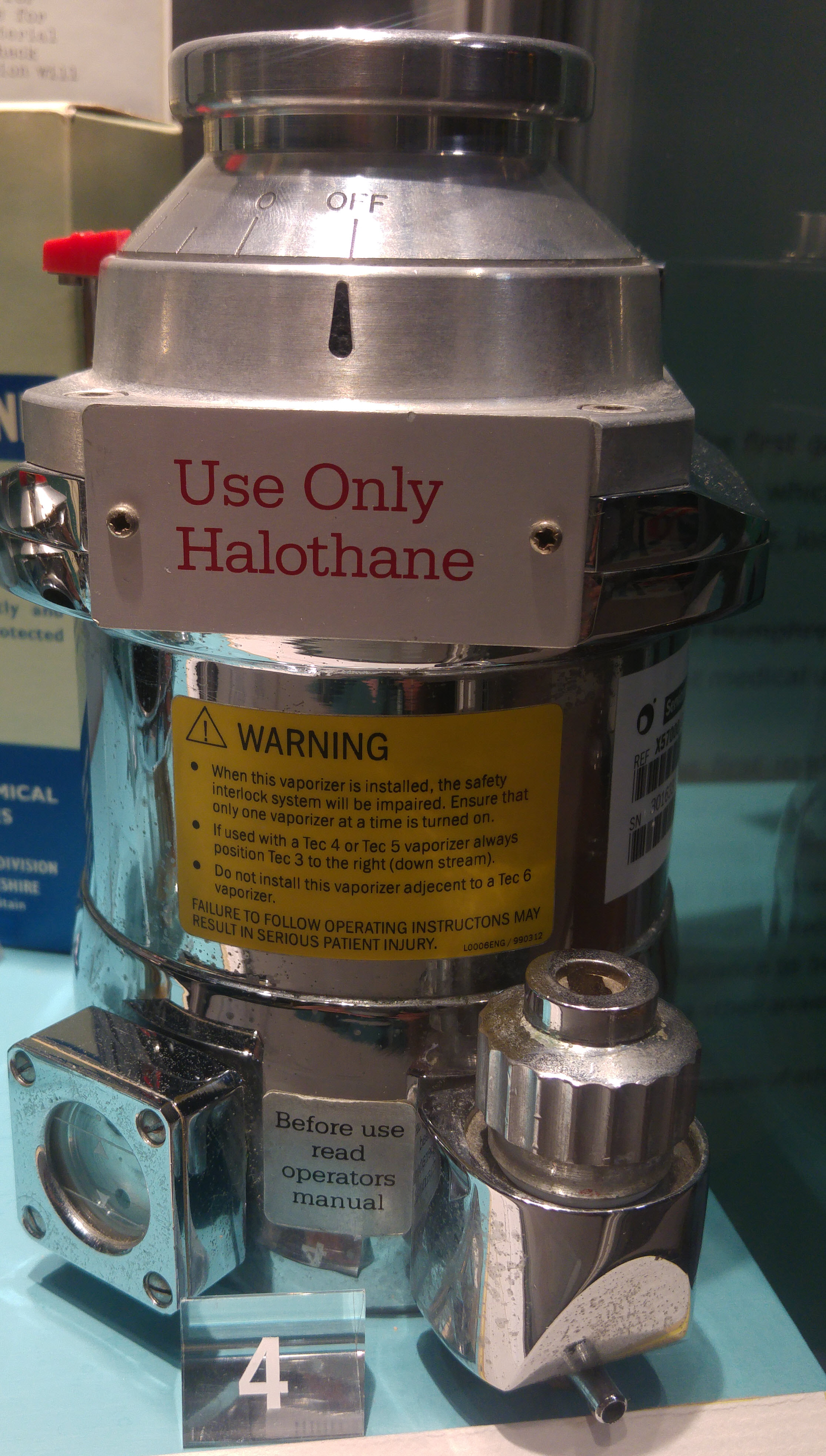
A vapouriser used for halothane

The first temperature-compensated plenum vaporizer was the Cyprane 'FluoTEC' Halothane vaporizer, released onto the market shortly after Halothane was introduced into clinical practice in 1956.

=== Drawover vaporizers ===
The drawover vaporizer is driven by negative pressure developed by the patient, and must therefore have a low resistance to gas flow. Its performance depends on the minute volume of the patient: its output drops with increasing minute ventilation.

The design of the drawover vaporizer is much simpler: in general it is a simple glass reservoir mounted in the breathing attachment. Drawover vaporizers may be used with any liquid volatile agent (including older agents such as diethyl ether or chloroform, although it would be dangerous to use desflurane). Because the performance of the vaporizer is so variable, accurate calibration is impossible. However, many designs have a lever which adjusts the amount of fresh gas which enters the vaporizing chamber.

The drawover vaporizer may be mounted either way round, and may be used in circuits where re-breathing takes place, or inside the circle breathing attachment.

Drawover vaporizers typically have no temperature compensating features. With prolonged use, the liquid agent may cool to the point where condensation and even frost may form on the outside of the reservoir. This cooling impairs the efficiency of the vaporizer. One way of minimising this effect is to place the vaporizer in a bowl of water.

The relative inefficiency of the drawover vaporizer contributes to its safety. A more efficient design would produce too much anesthetic vapor. The output concentration from a drawover vaporizer may greatly exceed that produced by a plenum vaporizer, especially at low flows. For safest use, the concentration of anesthetic vapor in the breathing attachment should be continuously monitored.

Despite its drawbacks, the drawover vaporizer is cheap to manufacture and easy to use. In addition, its portable design means that it can be used in the field or in veterinary anesthesia.

Triservice Anaesthetic Apparatus (TSAA) is a portable draw-over vapouriser using ambient air as the carrier gas for the anaesthetic vapour. It was designed by Ivan Houghton for military use in 1981. Original design included trichloroethylene for its analgesic properties and halothane for main general anaesthesia; it was later used with isoflurane.

=== Dual-circuit gas–vapor blender ===
The third category of vaporizer (the dual-circuit gas–vapor blender) was created specifically for the agent desflurane. Desflurane boils at 23.5 °C, which is very close to room temperature. This means that at normal operating temperatures, the saturated vapor pressure of desflurane changes greatly with only small fluctuations in temperature. This means that the features of a normal plenum vaporizer are not sufficient to ensure an accurate concentration of desflurane. Additionally, on a very warm day, all the desflurane would boil, and very high (potentially lethal) concentrations of desflurane might reach the patient.

A desflurane vaporizer (e.g. the TEC 6 produced by Datex-Ohmeda) is heated to 39C and pressurized to 194kPa. It is mounted on the anesthetic machine in the same way as a plenum vaporizer, but its function is quite different. It evaporates a chamber containing desflurane using heat, and injects small amounts of pure desflurane vapor into the fresh gas flow. A transducer senses the fresh gas flow.

A warm-up period is required after switching on. The desflurane vaporizer will fail if mains power is lost. Alarms sound if the vaporizer is nearly empty. An electronic display indicates the level of desflurane in the vaporizer.

The expense and complexity of the desflurane vaporizer have contributed to the relative lack of popularity of desflurane, although in recent years it is gaining in popularity.

=== Historical vaporizers ===
Historically, ether (the first volatile agent) was first used by John Snow's inhaler (1847) but was superseded by the use of chloroform (1848). Ether then slowly made a revival (1862–1872) with regular use via Curt Schimmelbusch's "mask", a narcosis mask for dripping liquid ether. Now obsolete, it was a mask constructed of wire, and covered with cloth.

Pressure and demand from dental surgeons for a more reliable method of administering ether helped modernize its delivery. In 1877, Clover invented an ether inhaler with a water jacket, and by the late 1899 alternatives to ether came to the fore, mainly due to the introduction of spinal anesthesia. Subsequently, this resulted in the decline of ether (1930–1956) use due to the introduction of cyclopropane, trichloroethylene, and halothane. By the 1980s, the anesthetic vaporizer had evolved considerably; subsequent modifications lead to a raft of additional safety features such as temperature compensation, a bimetallic strip, temperature-adjusted splitting ratio and anti-spill measures.

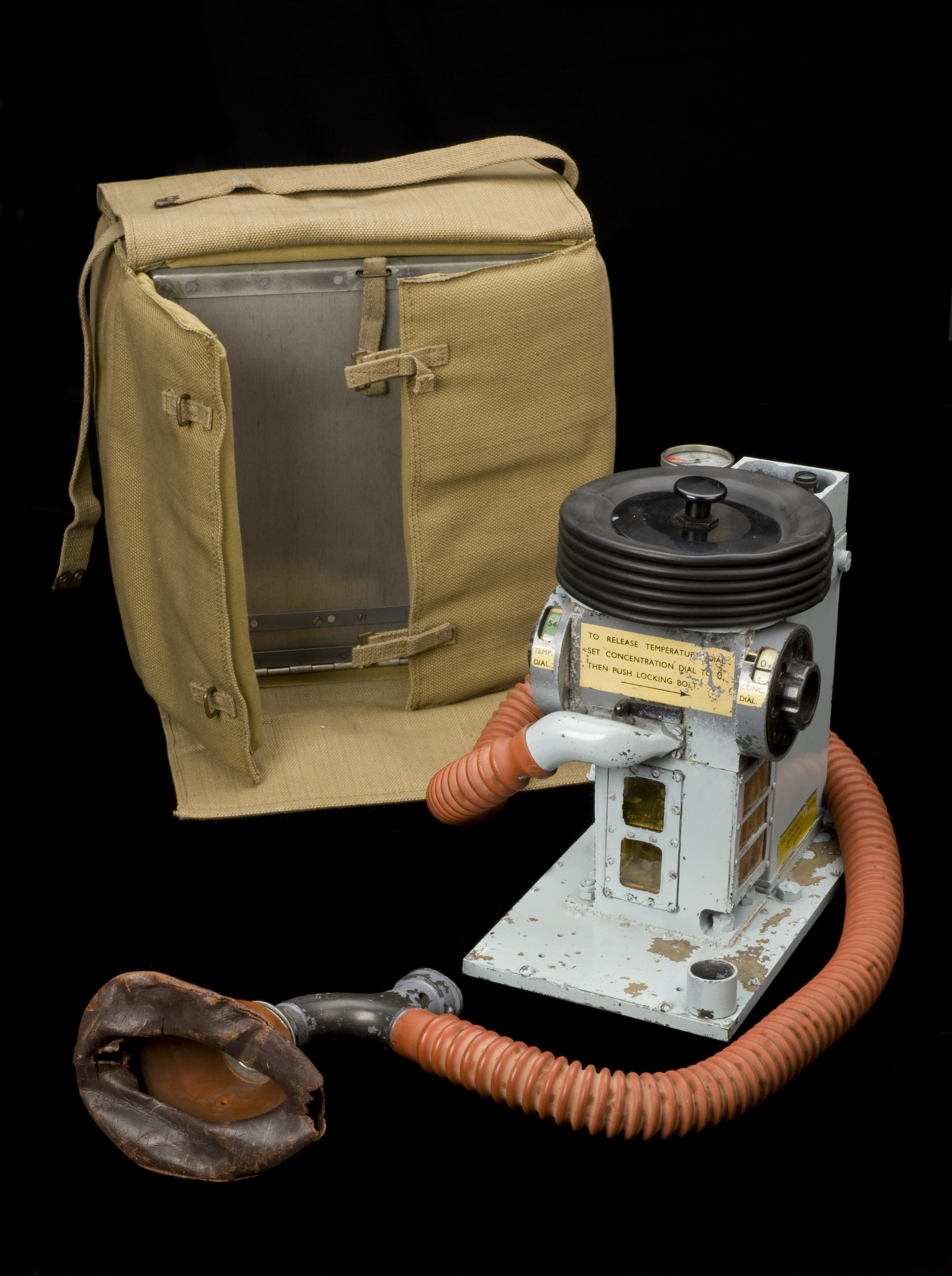
Chloroform vapouriser for field use (1945).

== Components of a typical machine ==
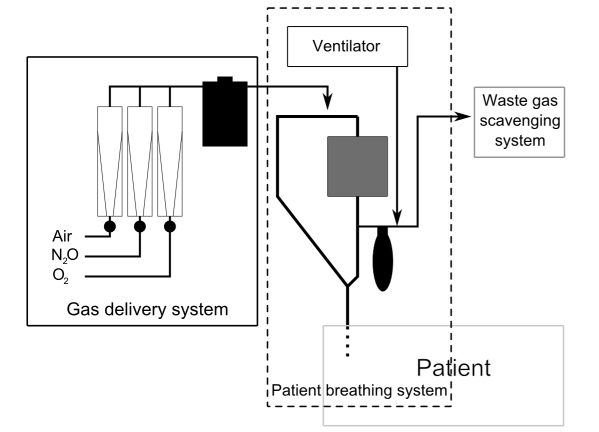
Simple schematic of an anaesthetic machine

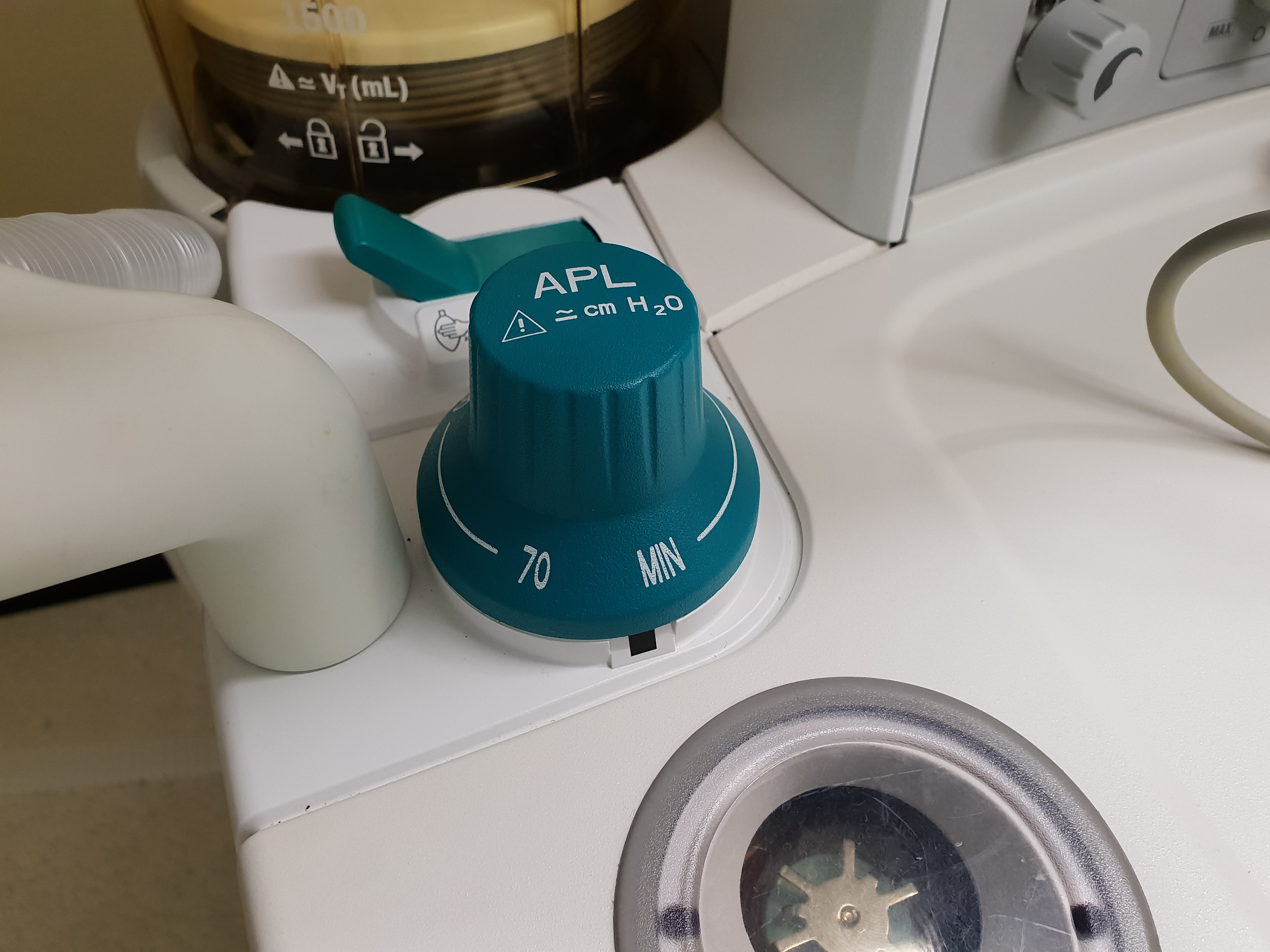
The adjustable pressure-limiting valve on a General Electric Datex-Ohmeda Aisys anaesthetic machine, with pressure gradations shown in centimetres of water

The breathing circuit is the ducting through which the breathing gases flow from the machine to the patient and back, and includes components for mixing, adjusting, and monitoring the composition of the breathing gas, and for removing carbon dioxide.

A modern anaesthetic machine includes at minimum the following components:

- Connections to piped oxygen, medical air, and nitrous oxide (N_{2}O) from a wall supply in the healthcare facility, or reserve gas cylinders of oxygen, air, and nitrous oxide attached via a pin index safety system yoke with a Bodok seal
- Pressure gauges, regulators and 'pop-off' valves, to monitor gas pressure throughout the system and protect the machine components and patient from excessive rises. An adjustable pressure-limiting valve (commonly abbreviated to APL valve, and also referred to as an expiratory valve, relief valve or spill valve) is part of the Breathing circuit which allows excess gas to leave the system while preventing ambient air from entering.
- Flowmeters such as rotameters for oxygen, air, and nitrous oxide
- Vaporisers to provide accurate dosage control when using volatile anaesthetics
- A high-flow oxygen flush, which bypasses the flowmeters and vaporisers to provide pure oxygen at 30-75 litres/minute
- Systems for monitoring the gases being administered to, and exhaled by, the patient, including an oxygen failure warning device

Systems for monitoring the patient's heart rate, ECG, blood pressure and oxygen saturation may be incorporated, in some cases with additional options for monitoring end-tidal carbon dioxide and temperature. Breathing systems are also typically incorporated, including a manual reservoir bag for ventilation in combination with an adjustable pressure-limiting valve, as well as an integrated mechanical ventilator, to accurately ventilate the patient during anaesthesia.

== Safety features of modern machines ==
Based on experience gained from analysis of mishaps, the modern anaesthetic machine incorporates several safety devices, including:

- an oxygen failure alarm (a.k.a. 'Oxygen Failure Warning Device' or OFWD). In older machines this was a pneumatic device called a Ritchie whistle which sounds when oxygen pressure is 38 psi descending. Newer machines have an electronic sensor.
- Nitrous cut-off or oxygen failure protection device, OFPD: the flow of medical nitrous-oxide is dependent on oxygen pressure. This is done at the regulator level. In essence, the nitrous-oxide regulator is a 'slave' of the oxygen regulator. i.e., if oxygen pressure is lost then the other gases can not flow past their regulator.
- hypoxic-mixture alarms (hypoxy guards or ratio controllers) to prevent gas mixtures which contain less than 21–25% oxygen being delivered to the patient. In modern machines it is impossible to deliver 100% nitrous oxide (or any hypoxic mixture) to the patient to breathe. Oxygen is automatically added to the fresh gas flow even if the anaesthesiologist should attempt to deliver 100% nitrous oxide. Ratio controllers usually operate on the pneumatic principle or are chain linked (link 25 system). Both are located on the rotameter assembly, unless electronically controlled.
- ventilator alarms, which warn of low or high airway pressures.
- interlocks between the vaporizers preventing inadvertent administration of more than one volatile agent concurrently
- alarms on all the above physiological monitors
- the Pin Index Safety System prevents cylinders being accidentally connected to the wrong yoke
- the NIST (Non-Interchangeable Screw Thread) or Diameter Index Safety System, DISS system for pipeline gases, which prevents piped gases from the wall being accidentally connected to the wrong inlet on the machine
- pipeline gas hoses have non-interchangeable Schrader valve connectors, which prevents hoses being accidentally plugged into the wrong wall socket

The functions of the machine should be checked at the beginning of every operating list in a "cockpit-drill". Machines and associated equipment must be maintained and serviced regularly.

Older machines may lack some of the safety features and refinements present on newer machines. However, they were designed to be operated without mains electricity, using compressed gas power for the ventilator and suction apparatus. Modern machines often have battery backup, but may fail when this becomes depleted.

The modern anaesthetic machine still retains all the key working principles of the Boyle's machine (a British Oxygen Company trade name) in honour of the British anaesthetist Henry Boyle. In India, however, the trade name 'Boyle' is registered with Boyle HealthCare Pvt. Ltd., Indore MP.

Various regulatory and professional bodies have formulated checklists for different countries. Machines should be cleaned between cases as they are at considerable risk of contamination with pathogens.

== See also ==
- Anaesthesia – State of medically-controlled temporary loss of sensation or awareness
- Anaesthetic vaporiser – Medical device to supply a mix of life-support and anaesthetic gases
- Breathing apparatus – Equipment allowing or assisting the user to breathe in a hostile environment
- Carbon dioxide scrubber – Device which absorbs carbon dioxide from circulated gas
- Ether Dome – Historic surgical operating amphitheater
- History of general anesthesia
- Soda lime – Chemical mixture for absorbing carbon dioxide
- Ventilator – Device that provides mechanical ventilation to the lungs
