= Schimmelbusch =

Schimmelbusch is a surname of German origin. Notable people with the surname include:

- Curt Schimmelbusch (1860–1895), German physician and pathologist
- Daryl Schimmelbusch (born 1954), Australian rules footballer
- Heinz Schimmelbusch (born 1944), Austrian businessman
- Wayne Schimmelbusch (born 1953), Australian rules footballer

== See also ==
- Schimmelbusch mask, anaesthesia device
