= American Standard Safety System =

The American Standard Safety System (ASSS) is a connection system for gas cylinders with a volume exceeding 25 cubic feet. The connections differ in thread type and size, right and left-handed threading, internal and external threading, and nipple-seat design. This variability reduces the risk of errors such as administering the wrong gas to a patient, or utilizing equipment calibrated for one gas with another. However, as there are only 26 connections for the 62 gases and mixtures recognized by the CGA, connections are not unique.

Connection specifications will be listed in cylinder catalogs as a list of abbreviations and numbers, such as that for O_{2}, CGA-540 0.903-14NGO-RH-Ext. This means that the Compressed Gas Association has classified this connection as number 540, the thread bore is 0.903 inches, with 14 threads per inch. The connection is right-handed (RH) and must be turned clock-wise to tighten. The threading is external, so the connections of the cylinder and the attached equipment must be fixed together using a nipple, which is signified by NGO. A nipple is a bolt which fits together two male connections. Internal (Int) threading allows for equipment to be screwed directly onto the cylinder outlet.

== See also ==
- Compressed Gas Association
- Pin Index Safety System
- Diameter Index Safety System
