= Breathing system =

Breathing system may refer to:

- Respiratory system, the biological system in the bodies of animals
- Artificial respiration, several systems to breathe artificially
  - Cardio-pulmonary resuscitation, a technique/system to maintain breathing when autonomic breathing fails
  - Ventilator
  - Breathing circuit, a medical device, to breathe and introduce anesthesia
- Breathing apparatus, equipment systems used to breathe in hostile environments

== See also ==
- Breathing
