= Henry Edmund Gaskin Boyle =

Henry Edmund Gaskin Boyle OBE (2 April 1875 – 15 October 1941) was a pioneering anaesthetist best remembered for the development of early anaesthetic machines.

== Early life ==
Born in Barbados, he was the only child of Henry Eudolphus Boyle, estate manager and his wife, Elizabeth, daughter of Benjamin Law Gaskin, a member of the House of Assembly. He moved to England in 1894 after schooling at Harrison College, Bridgetown.

== Professional life ==
Boyle qualified MRCS LRCP in 1901 from St Bartholomew's Hospital, London. He worked as a junior anaesthetist at Barts and was appointed visiting consultant in 1903. During World War I he worked with the Royal Army Medical Corps in London, publishing over 3600 cases anaesthetised with nitrous oxide-oxygen-ether. His work was recognised with an OBE.

Boyle promoted intratracheal insufflation techniques using nitrous oxide, oxygen and ether, replacing open-drop anaesthesia. Initially he used imported Gwathmey machines from the USA, but finding them unreliable, he developed his own continuous-flow machines. His design included cylinders for the gases and a "Boyle's Bottle" to vaporize diethyl ether. Until recently, an anaesthetic machine was often referred to as a "Boyle's Machine" in honour of his contribution.

His other contributions to anaesthesia include the Boyle-Davis gag (still used today during tonsillectomy operations) and a popular textbook, Practical Anaesthetics (1907 and two subsequent editions).

== Personal life ==
Boyle married Mildred Ethel Wildy Green (1879 - 1960), widow of architect Leslie William Green (1875 - 1908).

== Honours and Fellowships ==
He was president of the Section of Anaesthetics of the Royal Society of Medicine in 1923, a founding member of the Association of Anaesthetists of Great Britain and Ireland and an early examiner for the Diploma in Anaesthesia. Since 2000 the department at St Bartholomew's Hospital has been named the Boyle Department of Anaesthesia. Boyle was also a committed Freemason and a member of the Caribbean Lodge under the United Grand Lodge of England.
