= Karl Joseph Eberth =

German pathologist (1835–1926)

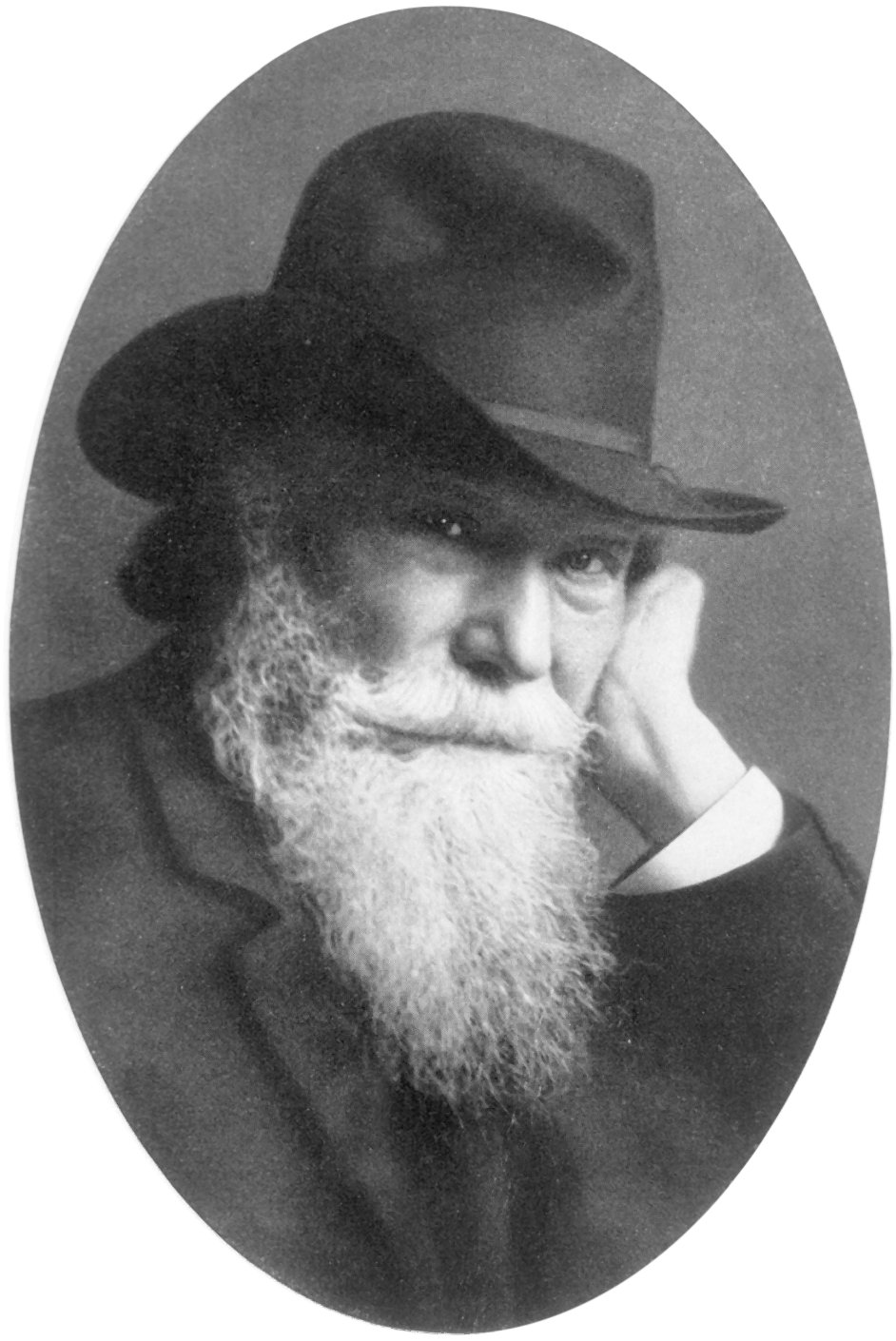
- Born: 21 September 1835; Würzburg, Germany
- Died: 2 December 1926 (aged 91); Berlin
- Education: University of Würzburg
- Known for: Discovery of the typhoid bacillus
- Scientific career
- Fields: Bacteriology, pathology
- Doctoral students: Oswald Bumke

Karl Joseph Eberth (21 September 1835 – 2 December 1926) was a German pathologist and bacteriologist who was a native of Würzburg.

== Biography ==
In 1859 he earned his doctorate at the University of Würzburg, and became an assistant to anatomist Albert von Kölliker (1817–1905). In 1869 he became a full professor of pathological anatomy at the University of Zurich, and from 1881 until his retirement in 1911, he was a professor at the University of Halle.

In 1880 Eberth described a bacillus that he suspected was the cause of typhoid. In 1884 pathologist Georg Theodor August Gaffky (1850–1918) confirmed Eberth's findings, and the organism was given names such as "Eberthella typhi", "Eberth's bacillus" and "Gaffky-Eberth bacillus". Today the bacillus that causes typhoid fever goes by the scientific name of Salmonella enterica subspecies enterica serovar Typhi.

== Associated eponyms ==
- "Eberth's lines": Microscopic lines that appear between the cells of the myocardium when stained with silver nitrate.
- "Eberth's perithelium": an incomplete layer of connective tissue cells encasing the blood capillaries.

== Selected works ==
- Untersuchungen über nematoden, (Leipzig : W. Engelmann, 1863).
- Zur Kenntnis der Bacteritischen Mykosen, (Leipzig : Engelmann, 1872).
- Zur kenntniss der blutplättchen bei den niederen wirbelthieren, (Leipzig, Engelmann, 1887).
- Die Thrombose nach Versuchen und Leichenbefunden, with Curt Schimmelbusch, (Stuttgart, 1888).
- Die männlichen Geschlechtsorgane, (Jena, Fischer, 1904).

== See also ==
- Pathology
- List of pathologists
