= Georg Theodor August Gaffky =

German physician (1850–1918)

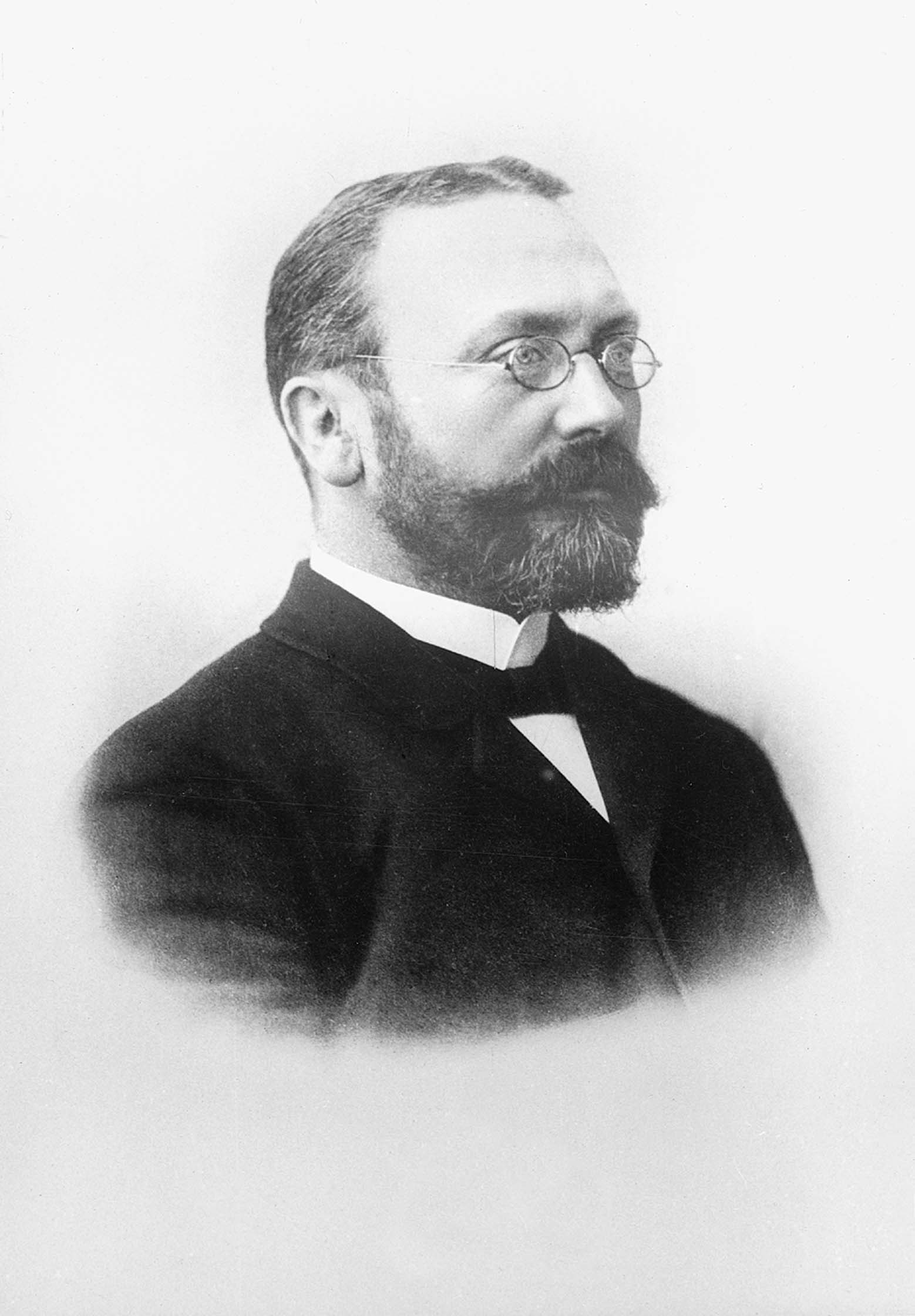
Georg Theodor August Gaffky.

Georg Theodor August Gaffky (17 February 1850 – 23 September 1918) was a Hanover-born bacteriologist best known for identifying bacillus salmonella typhi as the cause of typhoid disease in 1884.

== Early life and career ==
Gaffky's parents were the shipping agent Georg Friedrich Wilhelm Gaffky, and Emma Schumacher. His medical studies at the Friedrich Wilhelm University in Berlin were completed in 1873 after an interruption by the Franco-Prussian War in 1870. His dissertation postulated a relationship between lead poisoning and kidney disease. He worked as an assistant at the Berlin Charité hospital and passed the state medical exams in 1875. He then worked as an army surgeon.

Gaffky worked as an assistant to Robert Koch in Berlin. Under Koch's leadership, Gaffky and others developed bacteriological protocols and achieved progress in identifying causes of infectious diseases.

== Principal discoveries ==
Following Karl Joseph Eberth's description of a bacillus suspected as the cause of typhus, and Koch's independent work on the same organism, Gaffky dedicated years to improving culture methods to isolate the bacillus. He was able to produce cultures in gelatin and other hosts.

In 1884, Gaffky published results reporting that he had isolated the eberthella or Gaffky-Eberth bacillus in 26 of 28 cases of typhoid.

Gaffky was later part of an expedition to Egypt in which Koch identified transmission methods of cholera. He became a government advisor during the 1892 cholera outbreak in Hamburg. He led an investigation of the 1897 outbreak of bubonic plague in India.

Gaffky served as director of the Berlin Institute for Infectious Diseases from 1904–1913.
