= Pressure regulator =

Control valve that maintains the pressure of a fluid or gas

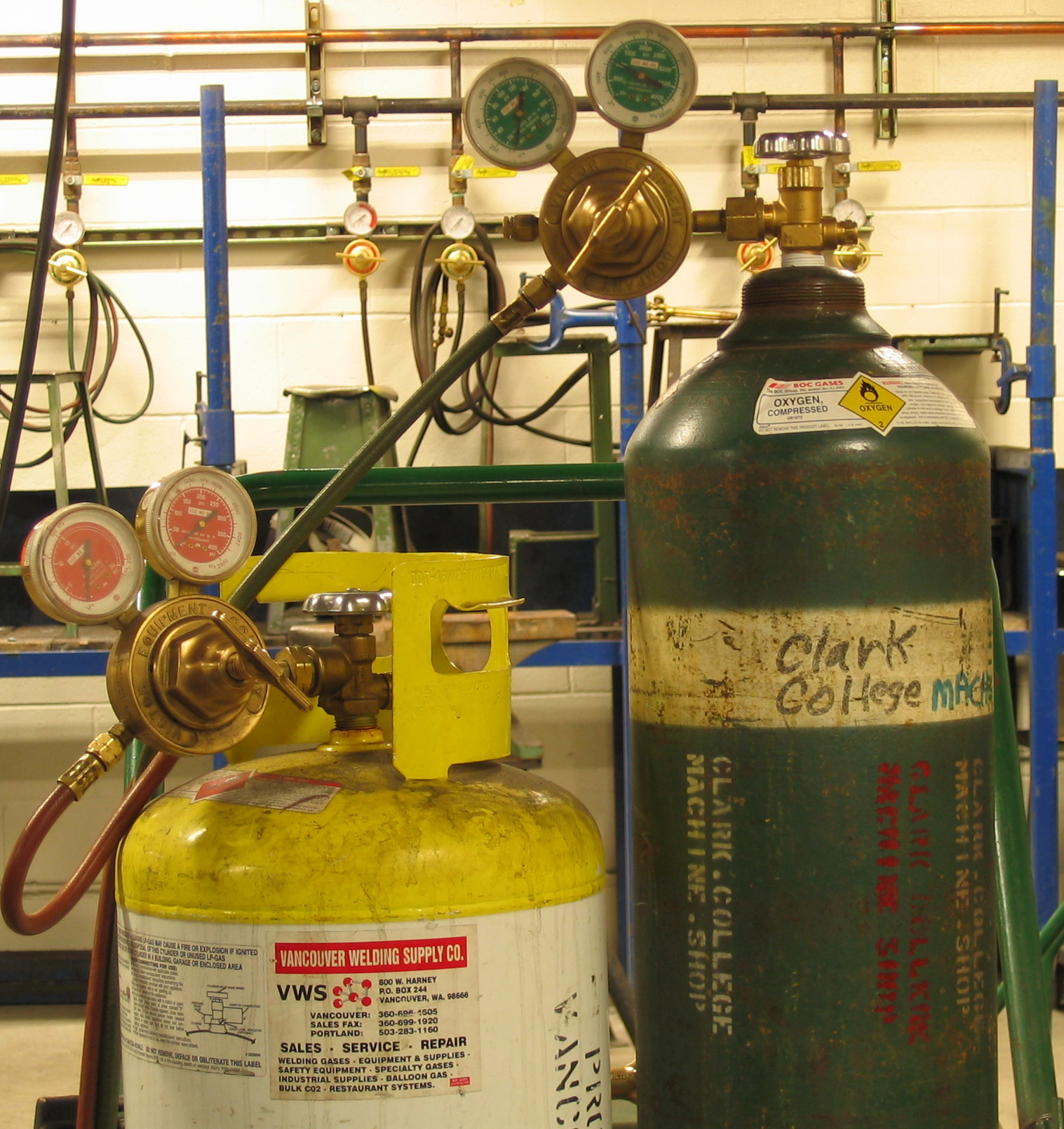
Oxygen and MAPP gas cylinders with two-stage pressure regulators

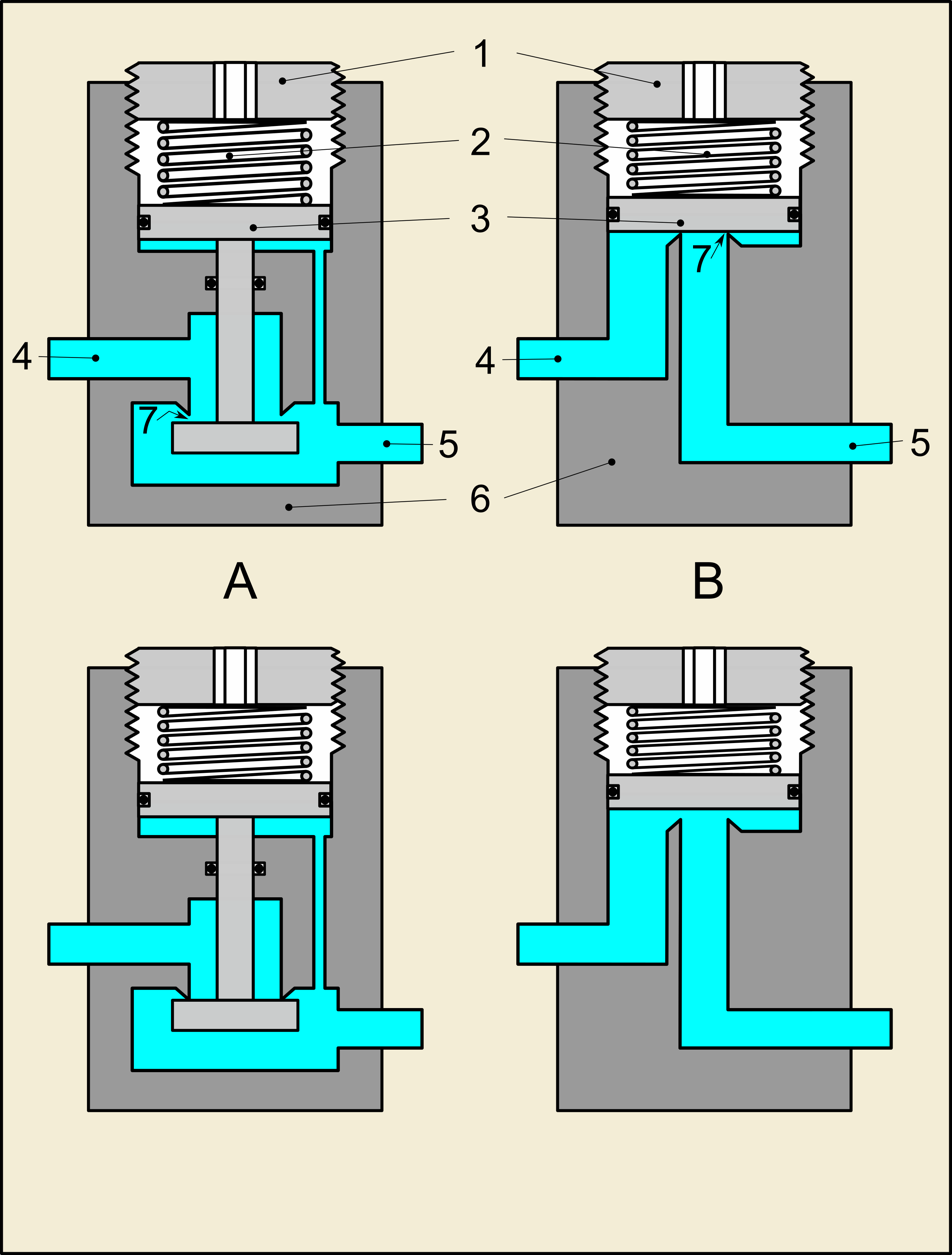
Schematic diagram of pressure reducing regulator (A) and back-pressure regulator (B). The upper diagrams show the normal state for the valves, which is normally open for pressure reducers and normally closed for back-pressure valves.: 1. Pressure-setting screw; 2. Spring; 3. Actuator; 4. Inlet port (high pressure); 5. Outlet port (low pressure); 6. Valve body; 7. Valve crown and seat

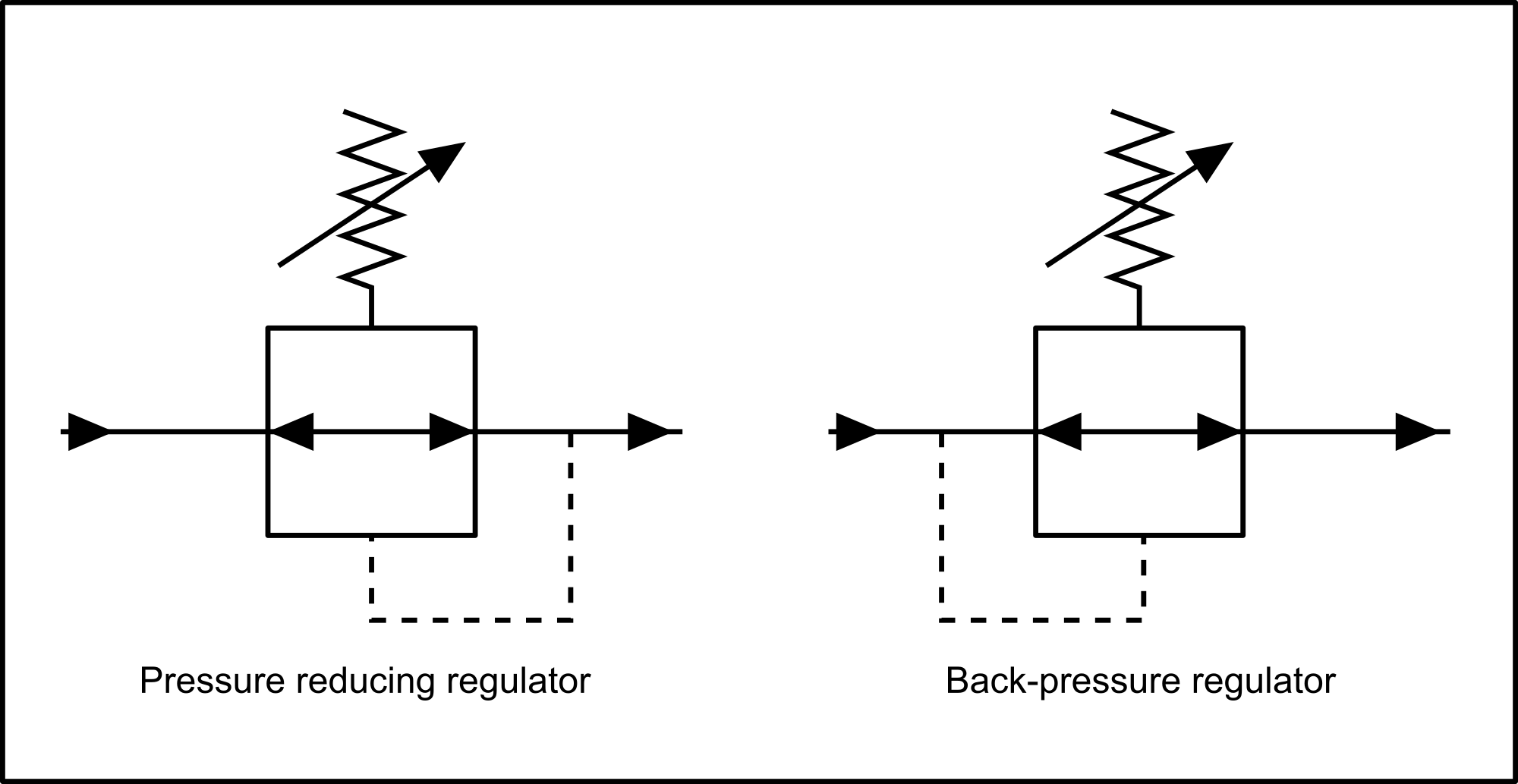
Diagram symbols for pressure-reduction and back-pressure regulators. The conceptual difference is mainly in which side the feedback is taken from.

A pressure regulator is a valve that controls the pressure of a fluid to a desired value, using negative feedback from the controlled pressure. Regulators are used for gases and liquids, and can be an integral device with a pressure setting, a restrictor and a sensor all in the one body, or consist of a separate pressure sensor, controller and flow valve.

Two types are found: the pressure reduction regulator and the back-pressure regulator.

- A pressure reducing regulator is a control valve that reduces the input pressure of a fluid to a desired value at its output. It is a normally-open valve and is installed upstream of pressure-sensitive equipment.
- A back-pressure regulator, back-pressure valve, pressure-sustaining valve or pressure-sustaining regulator is a control valve that maintains the set pressure at its inlet side by opening to allow flow when the inlet pressure exceeds the set value. It differs from an over-pressure relief valve in that the over-pressure valve is only intended to open when the contained pressure is excessive and is not required to keep upstream pressure constant. They differ from pressure-reducing regulators in that the pressure-reducing regulator controls downstream pressure and is insensitive to upstream pressure. It is a normally-closed valve which may be installed in parallel with sensitive equipment or after the sensitive equipment to provide an obstruction to flow and thereby maintain upstream pressure.

Both types of regulator use feedback of the regulated pressure as input to the control mechanism and are commonly actuated by a spring-loaded diaphragm or piston reacting to changes in the feedback pressure to control the valve opening. In both cases, the valve should be opened only enough to maintain the set regulated pressure. The actual mechanism may be very similar in all respects except the placing of the feedback pressure tap. As in other feedback control mechanisms, the level of damping is important to achieve a balance between fast response to a change in the measured pressure and stability of output. Insufficient damping may lead to hunting oscillation of the controlled pressure, while excessive friction of moving parts may cause hysteresis.

== Pressure reducing regulator ==
=== Operation ===
A pressure-reducing regulator's primary function is to match the flow of gas through the regulator to the demand for fluid placed upon it, whilst maintaining a sufficiently constant output pressure. If the load flow decreases, then the regulator flow must decrease as well. If the load flow increases, then the regulator flow must increase in order to keep the controlled pressure from decreasing because of a shortage of fluid in the pressure system. It is desirable that the controlled pressure does not vary greatly from the set point for a wide range of flow rates, but it is also desirable that flow through the regulator is stable and the regulated pressure is not subject to excessive oscillation.

A pressure regulator includes a restricting element, a loading element, and a measuring element:

- The restricting element is a valve that can provide a variable restriction to the flow, such as a globe valve, butterfly valve, poppet valve, etc.
- The loading element is a part that can apply the needed force to the restricting element. This loading can be provided by a weight, a spring, a piston actuator, or the diaphragm actuator in combination with a spring.
- The measuring element functions to determine when the inlet flow is equal to the outlet flow. The diaphragm itself is often used as a measuring element; it can serve as a combined element.

In the pictured single-stage regulator, a force balance is used on the diaphragm to control a poppet valve in order to regulate pressure. With no inlet pressure, the spring above the diaphragm pushes it down on the poppet valve, holding it open. Once inlet pressure is introduced, the open poppet allows flow to the diaphragm and pressure in the upper chamber increases, until the diaphragm is pushed upward against the spring, causing the poppet to reduce flow, finally stopping further increase of pressure. By adjusting the top screw, the downward pressure on the diaphragm can be increased, requiring more pressure in the upper chamber to maintain equilibrium. In this way, the outlet pressure of the regulator is controlled.

This operation is described by the following equation:
$$F = (P_\text{i} - P_\text{o}) s + P_\text{o} S + f,$$
where

$F$ – diaphragm spring force,
$f$ – poppet spring force,
$P_\text{i}$ – inlet pressure,
$P_\text{o}$ – outlet pressure,
$s$ – poppet area,
$S$ – diaphragm area.

=== Single-stage regulator ===
Single-stage pressure regulator

High-pressure gas from the supply enters the regulator through the inlet port. The inlet pressure gauge indicates this pressure. The gas then passes through the normally open pressure-control valve orifice, and the downstream pressure rises until the valve-actuating diaphragm is deflected sufficiently to close the valve, preventing any more gas from entering the low-pressure side until the pressure drops again. The outlet pressure gauge indicates this pressure.

The outlet pressure on the diaphragm and the inlet pressure and poppet spring force on the upstream part of the valve hold the diaphragm/poppet assembly in the closed position against the force of the diaphragm-loading spring. If the supply pressure falls, the closing force due to supply pressure is reduced, and downstream pressure rises slightly to compensate. Thus, if the supply pressure falls, the outlet pressure increases, provided the outlet pressure remains below the falling supply pressure. This is the cause of end-of-tank dump where the supply is provided by a pressurized gas tank. The operator can compensate for this effect by adjusting the spring load by turning the knob to restore outlet pressure to the desired level. With a single-stage regulator, when the supply pressure gets low, the lower inlet pressure causes the outlet pressure to climb. If the diaphragm-loading spring compression is not adjusted to compensate, the poppet can remain open and allow the tank to rapidly dump its remaining contents.

=== Double-stage regulator ===
Two-stage pressure regulator

Two-stage regulators are two regulators in series in the same housing that operate to reduce the pressure progressively in two steps instead of one. The first stage, which is preset, reduces the pressure of the supply gas to an intermediate stage; gas at that pressure passes into the second stage. The gas emerges from the second stage at a pressure (working pressure) set by user by adjusting the pressure-control knob at the diaphragm-loading spring. Two-stage regulators may have two safety valves, so that if there is any excess pressure between stages due to a leak at the first stage valve seat, the rising pressure will not overload the structure and cause an explosion.

An unbalanced single-stage regulator may need frequent adjustment. As the supply pressure falls, the outlet pressure may change, necessitating adjustment. In the two-stage regulator, there is improved compensation for any drop in the supply pressure.

== Applications ==
=== Pressure-reducing regulators ===
==== Air compressors ====
Air compressors are used in industrial, commercial, and home workshop environments to perform an assortment of jobs, including blowing things clean; running air-powered tools, and inflating things like tires, balls, etc. Regulators are often used to adjust the pressure coming out of an air receiver (tank) to match what is needed for the task. Often, when one large compressor is used to supply compressed air for multiple uses (often referred to as "shop air" if built as a permanent installation of pipes throughout a building), additional regulators are used to ensure that each separate tool or function receives the pressure it needs. This is important because some air tools, or uses for compressed air, require pressures that may cause damage to other tools or materials.

==== Aircraft ====
Pressure regulators are found in aircraft cabin pressurization, canopy seal pressure control, potable water systems, and waveguide pressurization.

==== Aerospace ====
Aerospace pressure regulators have applications in propulsion pressurant control for reaction control systems (RCS) and attitude control systems (ACS), where high vibration, large temperature extremes and corrosive fluids are present.

==== Cooking ====
Pressurized vessels can be used to cook food much more rapidly than at atmospheric pressure, as the higher pressure raises the boiling point of the contents. All modern pressure cookers have a pressure regulator valve and a pressure relief valve as a safety mechanism to prevent explosion in the event that the pressure regulator valve fails to adequately release pressure. Some older models lack a safety release valve. Most home cooking models are built to maintain a low and high pressure setting. These settings are usually 7 to 15 pounds per square inch (0.48 to 1.03 bar). Almost all home cooking units employ a very simple single-stage pressure regulator. Older models simply use a small weight on top of an opening that is lifted by excessive pressure to allow excess steam to escape. Newer models usually incorporate a spring-loaded valve that lifts and allows pressure to escape as pressure in the vessel rises. Some pressure cookers have a quick-release setting on the pressure regulator valve that essentially lowers the spring tension to allow the pressure to escape at a quick but still safe rate. Commercial kitchens also use pressure cookers, in some cases using oil-based pressure cookers to quickly deep-fry fast food. Pressure vessels of this sort can also be used as autoclaves to sterilize small batches of equipment and in home canning operations.

==== Water pressure reduction ====
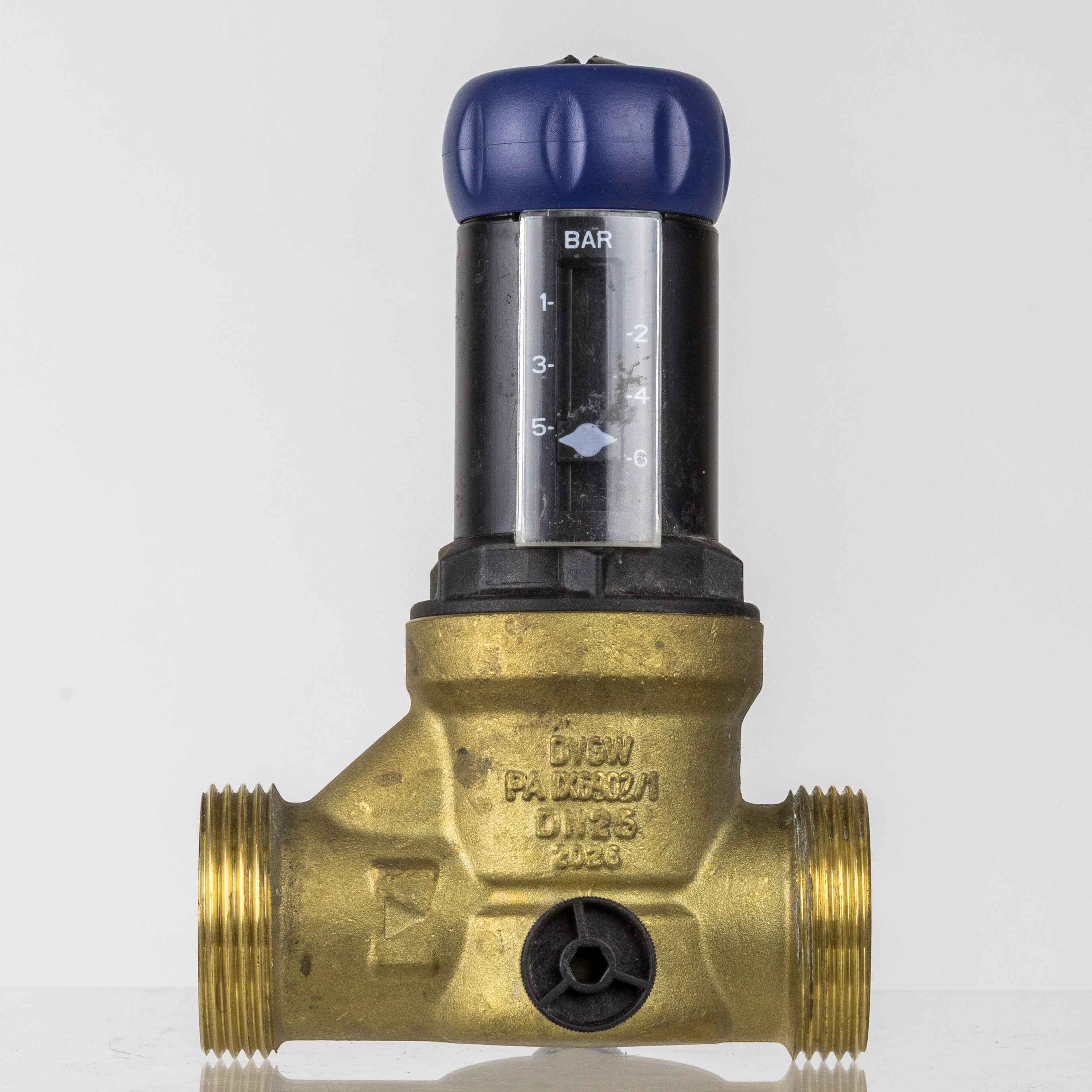
Pressure regulator for domestic water supply. Outlet pressure is set with the blue handwheel and shown on the vertical scale.

A water-pressure regulating valve limits inflow by dynamically changing the valve opening so that when less pressure is on the outside, the valve opens up fully, and too much pressure on the outside causes the valve to shut. In a no-pressure situation, where water could flow backwards, it is not impeded. A water-pressure regulating valve does not function as a check valve.

They are used to avoid damage to appliances or pipes in applications where the water pressure at the end of the line is too high.

==== Welding and cutting ====
Oxy-fuel welding and cutting processes require gases at specific pressures, and regulators are generally used to reduce the high pressures of storage cylinders to those usable for cutting and welding. Oxygen and fuel gas regulators usually have two stages. The first stage of the regulator releases the gas at a constant pressure from the cylinder despite the pressure in the cylinder becoming less as the gas is released. The second stage of the regulator controls the pressure reduction from the intermediate pressure to low pressure. The final flow rate may be adjusted at the torch. The regulator assembly usually has two pressure gauges: one indicating cylinder pressure, the other indicating delivery pressure. Inert-gas-shielded arc welding also uses gas stored at high pressure provided through a regulator. There may be a flow gauge calibrated to the specific gas.

==== Propane/LP gas ====
All propane and LP gas applications require the use of a regulator. Because pressures in propane tanks can fluctuate significantly with temperature, regulators must be present to deliver a steady pressure to downstream appliances. These regulators normally compensate for tank pressures between 30 and 200 psi (2.1 and 13.8 bar) and commonly deliver 11 inches water column 0.4 psi (28 mbar) for residential applications and 35 inches of water column 1.3 psi (90 mbar) for industrial applications. Propane regulators differ in size and shape, delivery pressure and adjustability, but are uniform in their purpose to deliver a constant outlet pressure for downstream requirements. Common international settings for domestic LP gas regulators are 28 mbar for butane and 37 mbar for propane.

==== Gas-powered vehicles ====
All vehicular motors that run on compressed gas as a fuel (internal combustion engine or fuel-cell electric power train) require a pressure regulator to reduce the stored gas (CNG or hydrogen) pressure from 700, 500, 350 or 200 bar (70, 50, 35 and 20 MPa) to operating pressure.)

==== Recreational vehicles ====
For recreational vehicles with plumbing, a pressure regulator is required to reduce the pressure of an external water supply connected to the vehicle plumbing, as the supply may be at a much higher elevation than the campground, and water pressure depends on the height of the water column. Without a pressure regulator, the intense pressure encountered at some campgrounds in mountainous areas may be enough to burst the camper's water pipes or unseat the plumbing joints, causing flooding. Pressure regulators for this purpose are typically sold as small screw-on accessories that fit inline with the hoses used to connect an RV to the water supply, which are almost always screw-thread-compatible with the common garden hose.

==== Breathing gas supply ====
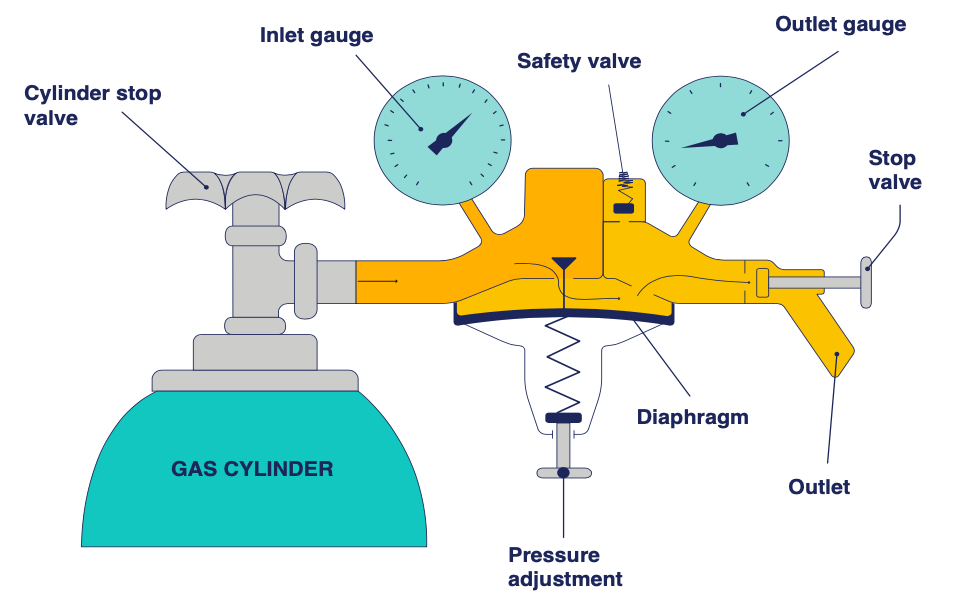
Two-gauge pressure regulator connected to gas cylinder used for breathing gas supply

Pressure regulators are used with diving cylinders for scuba diving. The tank may contain pressures in excess of 3,000 psi (210 bar), which could cause a fatal barotrauma injury to a person breathing it directly. A demand-controlled regulator provides a flow of breathing gas at the ambient pressure (which varies by depth in the water). Pressure-reducing regulators are also used to supply breathing gas to surface-supplied divers and people who use self-contained breathing apparatus (SCBA) for rescue and hazmat work on land. The interstage pressure for SCBA at normal atmospheric pressure can generally be left constant at a factory setting, but for surface-supplied divers it is controlled by the gas panel operator, depending on the diver depth and flow-rate requirements. Supplementary oxygen for high-altitude flight in unpressurised aircraft and medical gases are also commonly dispensed through pressure-reducing regulators from high-pressure storage.

Supplementary oxygen may also be dispensed through a regulator which both reduces the pressure and supplies the gas at a metered flow rate, to be mixed with ambient air. One way of producing a constant mass flow at variable ambient pressure is to use a choked flow, where the flow through the metering orifice is sonic. For a given gas in choked flow, the mass flow rate may be controlled by setting the orifice size or the upstream pressure. To produce a choked flow in oxygen, the absolute pressure ratio of upstream and downstream gas must exceed 1.893 at 20 °C. At normal atmospheric pressure this requires an upstream pressure of more than 1.013 × 1.893 = 1.918 bar. A typical nominal regulated gauge pressure from a medical oxygen regulator is 3.4 bar (50 psi), for an absolute pressure of approximately 4.4 bar and a pressure ratio of about 4.4 without back pressure, so they have choked flow in the metering orifices for a downstream (outlet) pressure of up to about 2.3 bar absolute. This type of regulator commonly uses a rotor plate with calibrated orifices and detents to hold it in place when the orifice corresponding to the desired flow rate is selected. This type of regulator may also have one or two uncalibrated takeoff connections from the intermediate pressure chamber with diameter index safety system (DISS) or similar connectors to supply gas to other equipment, and the high-pressure connection is commonly a pin index safety system (PISS) yoke clamp. Similar mechanisms can be used for flow-rate control for aviation and mountaineering regulators.

==== Mining industry ====
As the pressure in water pipes builds rapidly with depth, underground mining operations require a fairly complex water system with pressure-reducing valves. These devices must be installed at a certain vertical interval, usually 600 feet (180 m). Without such valves, pipes could burst, and pressure would be too great for equipment operation.

==== Natural gas industry ====
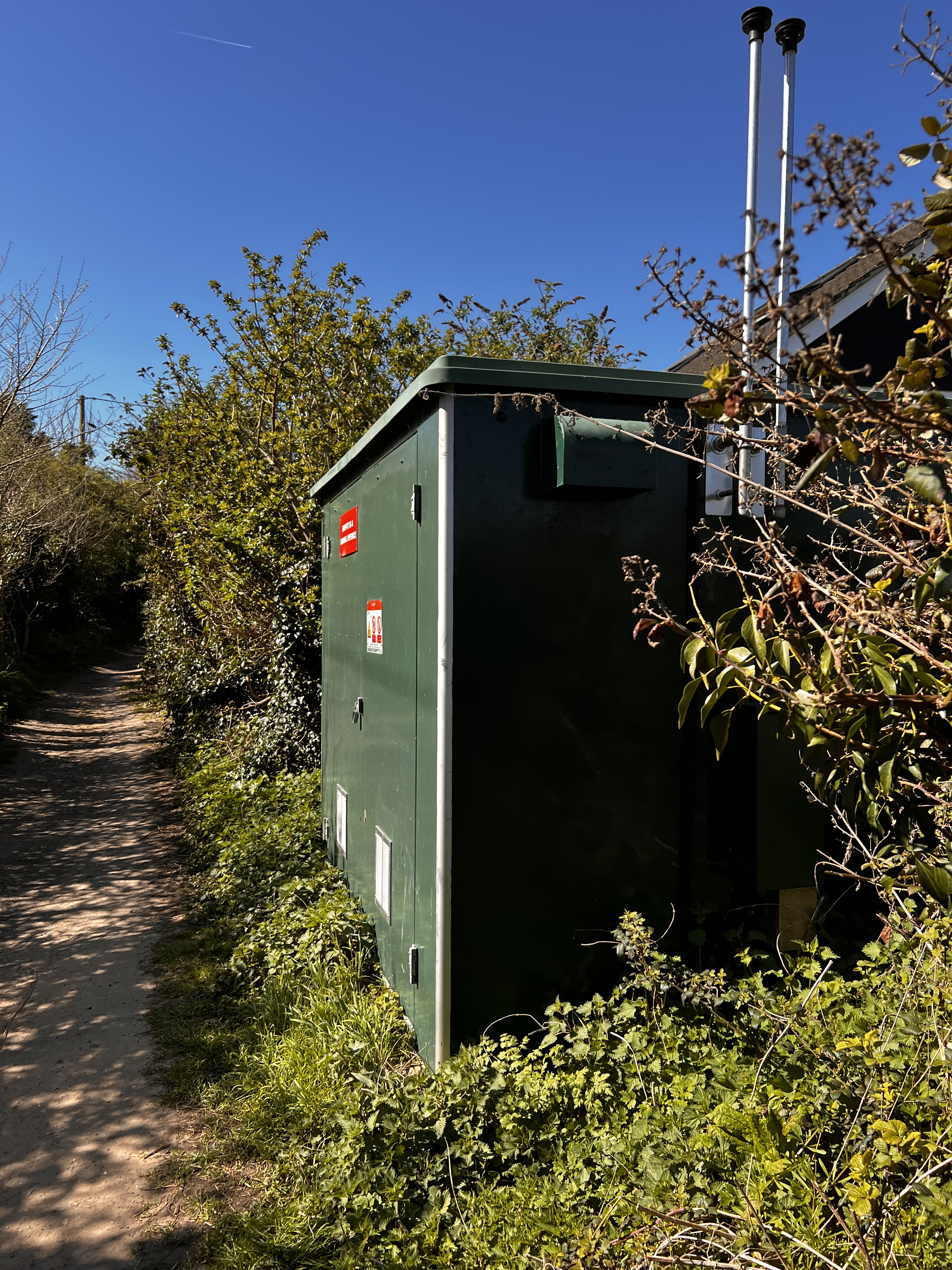
Natural gas pressure regulating kiosk

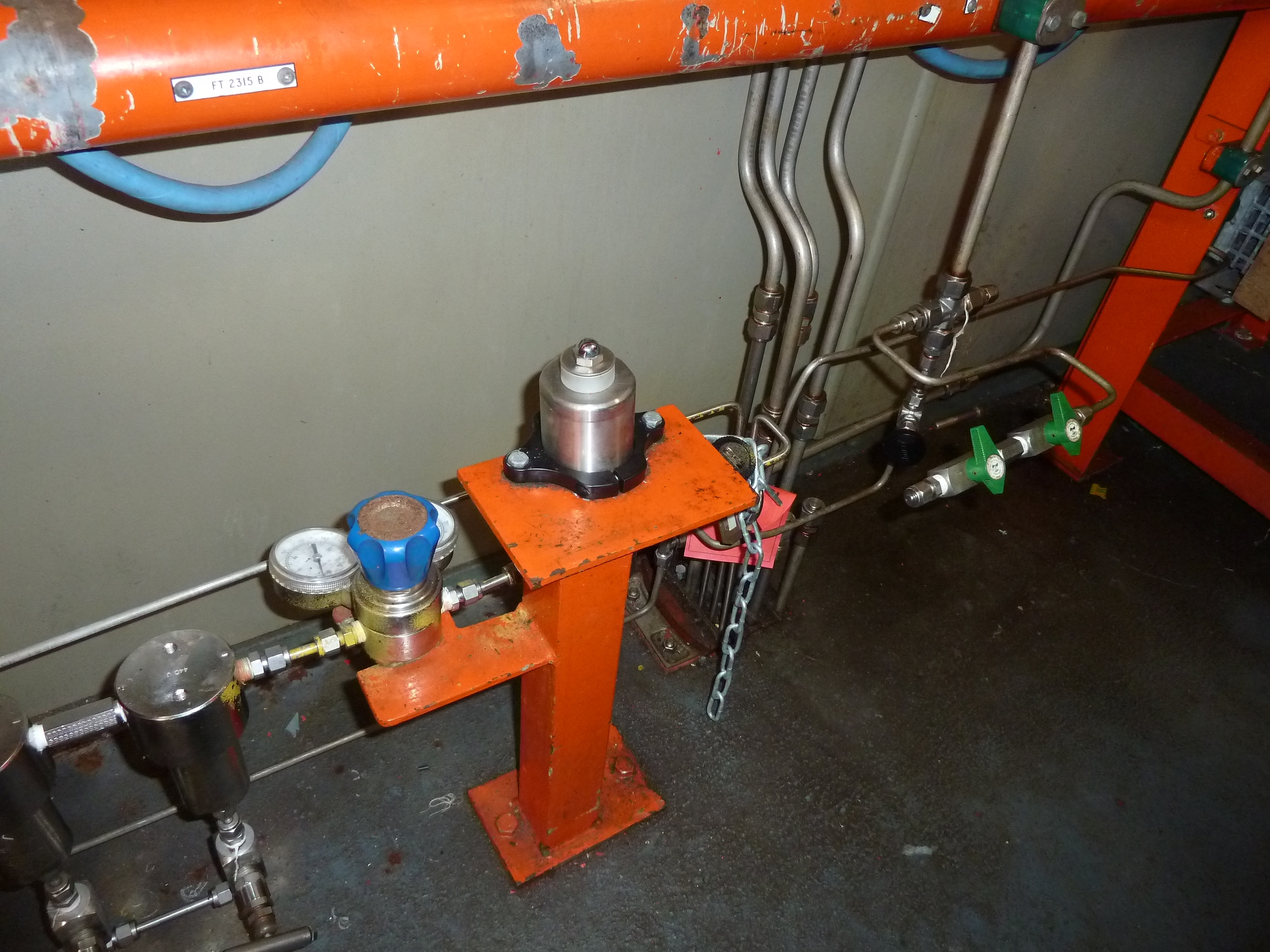
Industrial natural gas pressure regulator

Pressure regulators, also known as gas governors, are used extensively in the natural gas supply industry to control pressure. Natural gas is compressed to high pressures in order to be transmitted and distributed throughout the country through large transmission pipelines, up to 42-inch or 1.07 m diameter. The transmission pressure can be over 1,000 psi (69 bar) and must be reduced through several stages to a usable pressure for industrial, commercial, and residential applications. A distribution system may comprise three main pressure-reduction locations. The first reduction station is located at the outskirts of an urban area, where the pressure is reduced to a distribution pressure to be fed throughout the supply area. It is undesirable to locate high-pressure pipelines in urban areas due to the risk of damage and release of high-pressure flammable gas. Industrial users may take a supply at this reduced pressure. This may be the location where the odorless natural gas is odorized with mercaptan (in the United Kingdom this is done at the high-pressure supply terminal). The distribution pressure is further reduced at a district regulator station, located at various points in the supply area, to below 60 psig (4.13 barg). The final reduction occurs at the end-users location, see image. Generally, the end-user reduction is taken to low pressures ranging from 0.25 to 5 psig (0.01 to 0.34 barg). Some industrial applications can require a higher pressure.

=== Back-pressure regulators ===
- Maintain upstream pressure control in analytical or process systems
- Protect sensitive equipment from overpressure damage
- Reduce the pressure difference over a component which is not tolerant of large pressure differences.
- Gas sales lines
- Production vessels (e.g., Separators, heater treaters or free water knockouts)
- Vent or flare lines

==== Hyperbaric chambers ====
Where the pressure drop on a built-in breathing system exhaust system is too great, typically in saturation systems, a back-pressure regulator may be used to reduce the exhaust pressure drop to a safer and more manageable pressure.

==== Reclaim diving helmets ====
The depth at which most heliox breathing mixtures are used in surface-supplied diving is generally at least 5 bar above surface atmospheric pressure, and the exhaust gas from the diver must pass through a reclaim valve, which is a back-pressure valve activated by the increase in pressure in the diver's helmet above ambient pressure caused by diver exhalation. The reclaim gas hose which carries the exhaled gas back to the surface for recycling must not be at too great a pressure difference from the ambient pressure at the diver. An additional back-pressure regulator in this line allows finer setting of the reclaim valve for lower work of breathing at variable depths.

== See also ==
- Built-in breathing system – System for supply of breathing gas on demand within a confined space
- Control valve – Flow-control device
- Negative feedback – Control concept
