= Pin Index Safety System =

Component of medical gas supply systems

Pin index dimensions

The Pin Index Safety System (PISS) is a means of connecting high pressure cylinders containing medical gases to a regulator or other utilization equipment. It uses geometric features on the valve and yoke to prevent mistaken use of the wrong gas. This system is widely used worldwide for anesthesia machines, portable oxygen administration sets, and inflation gases used in surgery.

== Concept ==
The pin index safety system uses a face seal between the cylinder valve and the associated yoke clamp. There are two holes in specific positions on the cylinder valve body below the outlet port, in positions associated with the gas mixture, which prevent connection of the cylinder to a yoke or pressure regulator with a mis-matched set of pins. The holes accept pins 4 mm diameter by 6 mm long which are correctly aligned with the holes.

== Pin index configurations ==
Pin numbers

Each gas cylinder has a pin configuration to fit its respective gas yoke. Refer to the diagram for pin numbers; dimensions are in millimeters.

- O_{2}: 2,5
- N_{2}O: 3,5
- Mixture of O_{2} and N_{2}O (50% / 50%), commonly called Entonox: 7 (a single pin, located in the centre)
- Air: 1,5
- Mixtures of CO_{2} and O_{2} with more than 7% CO_{2}: 1,6
- Mixtures of CO_{2} and O_{2} with less than 7% CO_{2}: 2,6
- He: No pin
- Mixtures of O_{2} and He with less than 80% He, commonly called Heliox: 2,4
- Mixtures of O_{2} and He with more than 80% He: 4-6
- Cyclopropane: 3,6
- Ethylene: 1,3
- Nitrogen: 1,4
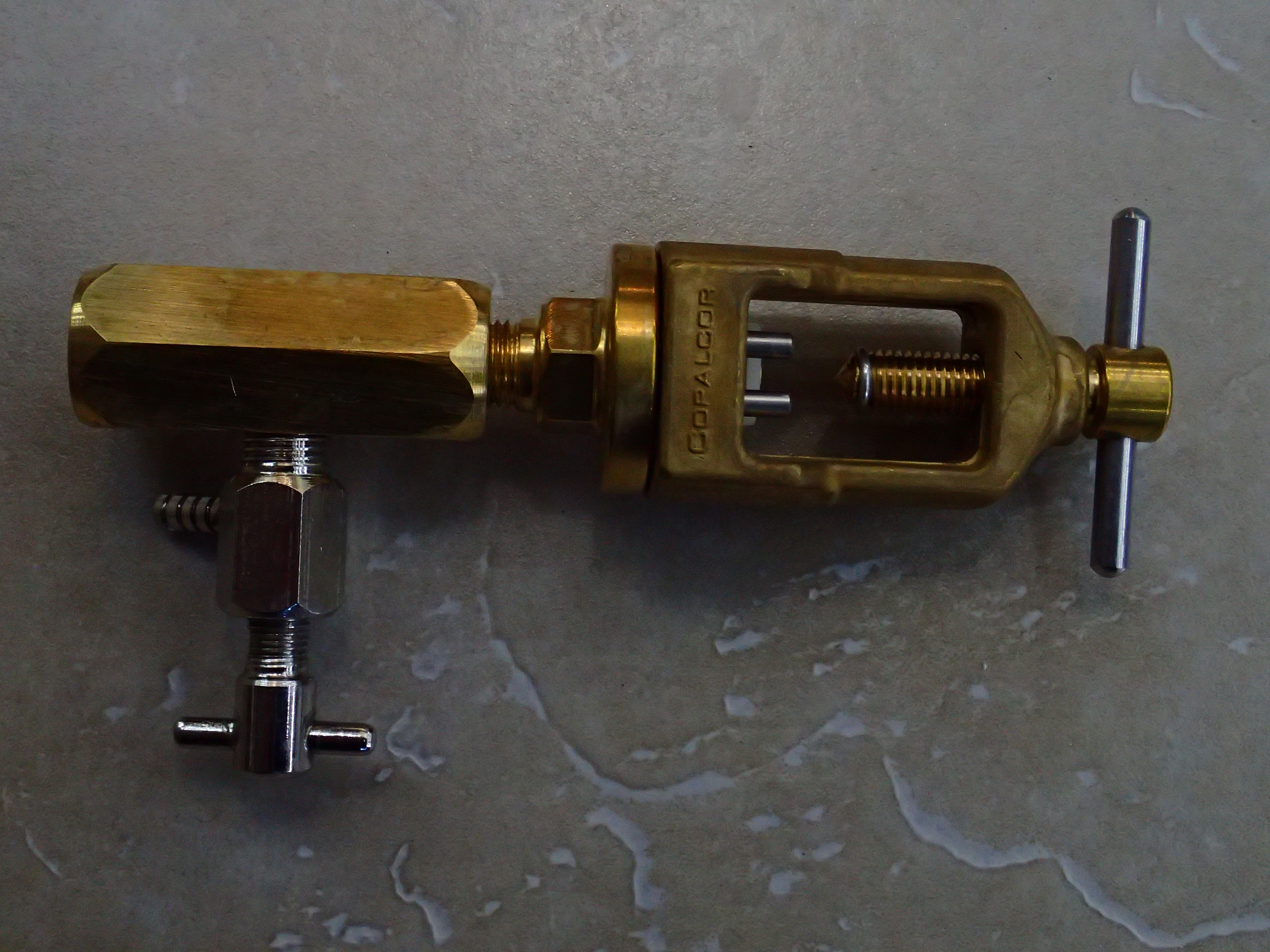
Pin index yoke connector for medical oxygen filling whip

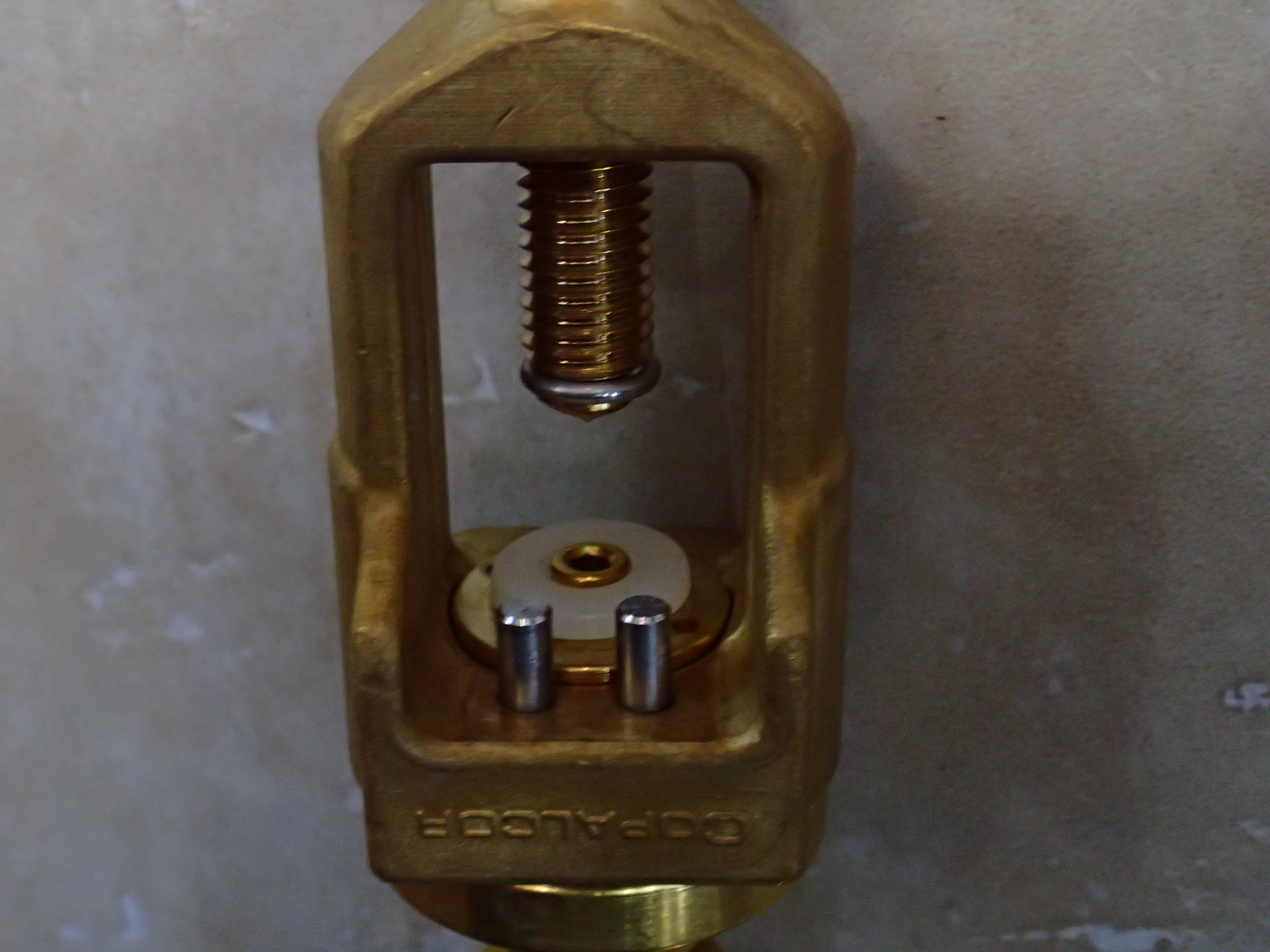
Detail of pin index yoke connector for medical oxygen

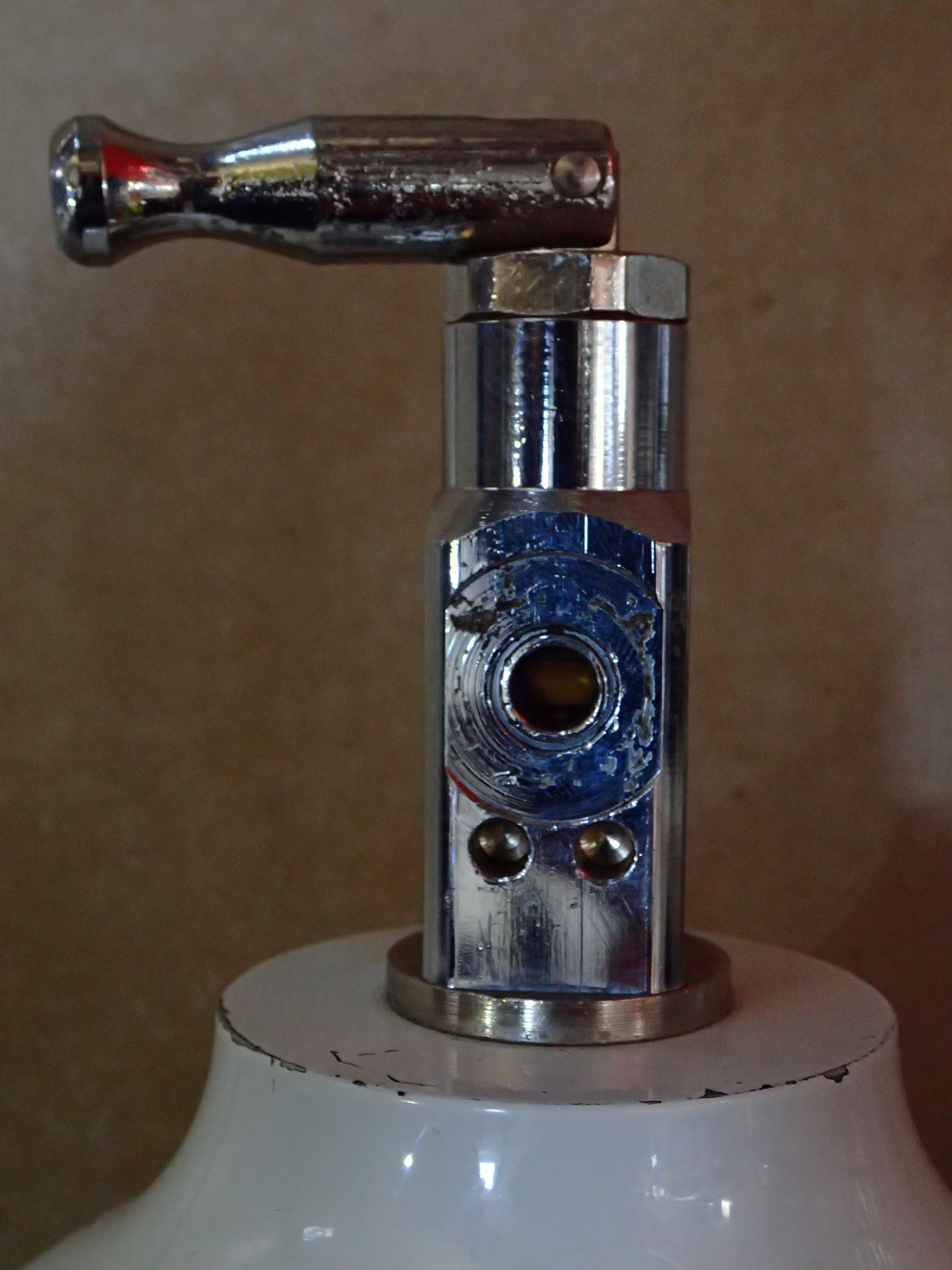
Pin index medical oxygen cylinder valve

== International Standards ==
- International (ISO) and European (CEN) Standard

- EN ISO 407 : Small medical gas cylinders - Pin-index yoke-type valve connections

The pin index system is a safety system (PISS) designed to ensure the correct gas is filled into the correct cylinder, and that the cylinder will only connect to the correct equipment. The positions of the holes on the cylinder valve correspond with the pins fitted to the yoke attached to the equipment. The pin positions for each medical gas are unique. If an attempt is made to fit the wrong gas cylinder to the yoke a tight seal will not be made, as the pins cannot locate.

The system requires a seal between the yoke and valve to prevent leakage. This is called a Bodok seal, and is a moulded rubber washer (or Neoprene) supported by a metal rim.

== Bodok seal ==
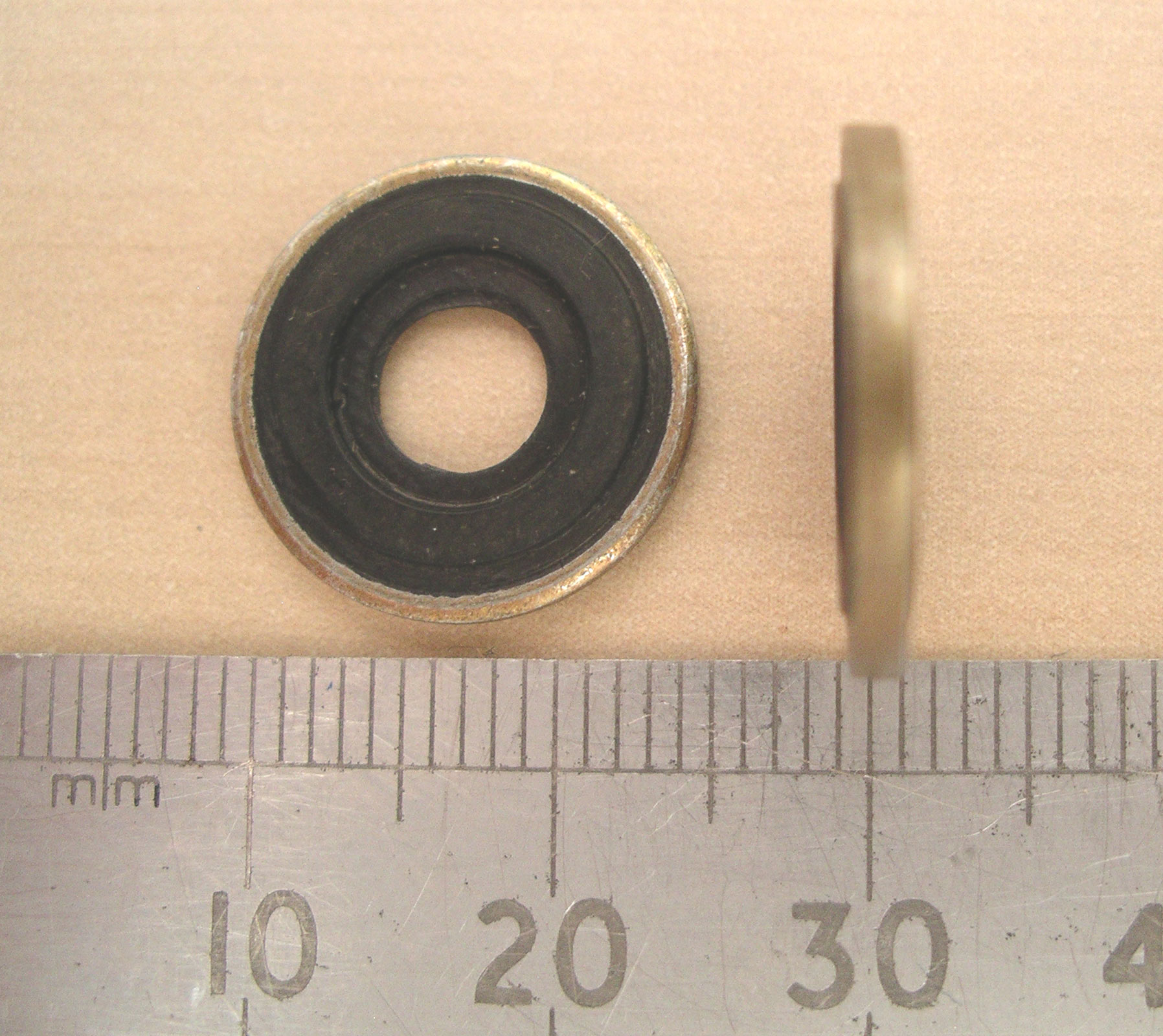
Bodok Seal

The Bodok seal is a specialised washer that ensures a gas-tight seal between the cylinder yoke or regulator of an anaesthetic machine or any medical device requiring a gas supply, and a gas cylinder. It was introduced along with the pin index safety system during the 1950s.

Attachment and detachment of a gas cylinder leads to constant wear and tear, due in part to mechanical distress and to gaseous compression and expansion. Adiabatic effects in rapidly expanding compressed gases can generate very low temperatures, necessitating a sufficiently durable and cold-resistant material such as neoprene. Prior to the introduction of the Bodok seal, the traditional fibre washer would frequently splay and cause leakage or adhere to the regulator, thus requiring the use of pliers and considerable force to remove it.

The Bodok seal consists of a neoprene washer with a peripheral metal reinforcing ring to prevent splaying. The seal is incombustible and resistant to the high pressures imposed upon it by cylinder gases, approximately 2,000 psi (140 bar) in a full cylinder.

Care must be taken when replacing gas cylinders that the Bodok seal does not stick to the cylinder valve face, and is thus 'lost' when the new cylinder is fitted, preventing a gas tight seal.

Bodok seals are also used in emergency oxygen kits used in first aid for underwater diving, but diving regulators used for scuba cylinders generally use a conventional o-ring seal with either a DIN 477 or CGA 850 yoke connector.

== Limitations ==
It is possible to bypass the pin-index system if the pins are removed, damaged or corroded, if extra washers are used, or on some valves with a short face above the orifice, by inverting the gas cylinder. There is one report of the cylinder being painted the wrong colour leading to error.

== Alternative systems ==
Medical gas cylinders larger than size E (679 liters) are more likely to be fitted with threaded connectors. The connections used for larger cylinders vary widely among jurisdictions. One such system are the American CGA fittings. In Europe there are British Standard (BS), German Standard (DIN) and French (AFNOR) connections, and Japan has the Japanese Standard (JIS).

== Blanking plugs ==
Blanking plugs (dummy cylinder heads) can be inserted into empty yokes to ensure that there is no leak out of the yoke when not in use.

== See also ==
- Diameter Index Safety System, used for lower pressure connections of medical gases
