= Compressed Gas Association =

American trade association for industrial and medical gas industries

- Formation: 1913; 113 years ago
- Type: 501(c)(6)
- Tax ID no.: 13-0594100
- Location: McLean, Virginia
- Endowment: $3,323,260
- Website: www.cganet.com

The Compressed Gas Association (CGA) is an American trade association for the industrial and medical gas supply industries.

The CGA publishes standards and practices that codify industry practices. In cases where government regulation is inspecific, CGA documents are considered authoritative. CGA falls into a group of trade associations whose publications are relied on by government. These groups include the National Fire Protection Association (NFPA) and ASTM International. For example, the state of Montana, the U.S. Army, and OSHA point to CGA documents for regulatory guidance.

== Cylinder valve openings ==
The CGA provides detail specifications for the outlet connections of gas containers. They are based on the storage pressure and characteristics of the gas such as flammability, toxicity, state (permanent gas or liquefied) and corrosiveness. These connections are identified by a 3-digit number, such as CGA-555. The range of available connection standards covers the majority of the range of industrial, ultra-pure and medical gases in use, including the medical pin index safety system, scuba cylinder valves and liquefied natural gas for home use.

The standards include:

- CGA V-1 Standard for Compressed Gas Cylinder Valve Outlet and Inlet Connections
- CGA V-7 Standard Method of Determining Cylinder Valve Outlet Connections for Industrial Gas Mixtures
- CGA V-7.1 Standard Method of Determining Cylinder Valve Outlet Connections for Medical Gases
