= Schimmelbusch mask =

System for delivering an anesthetic

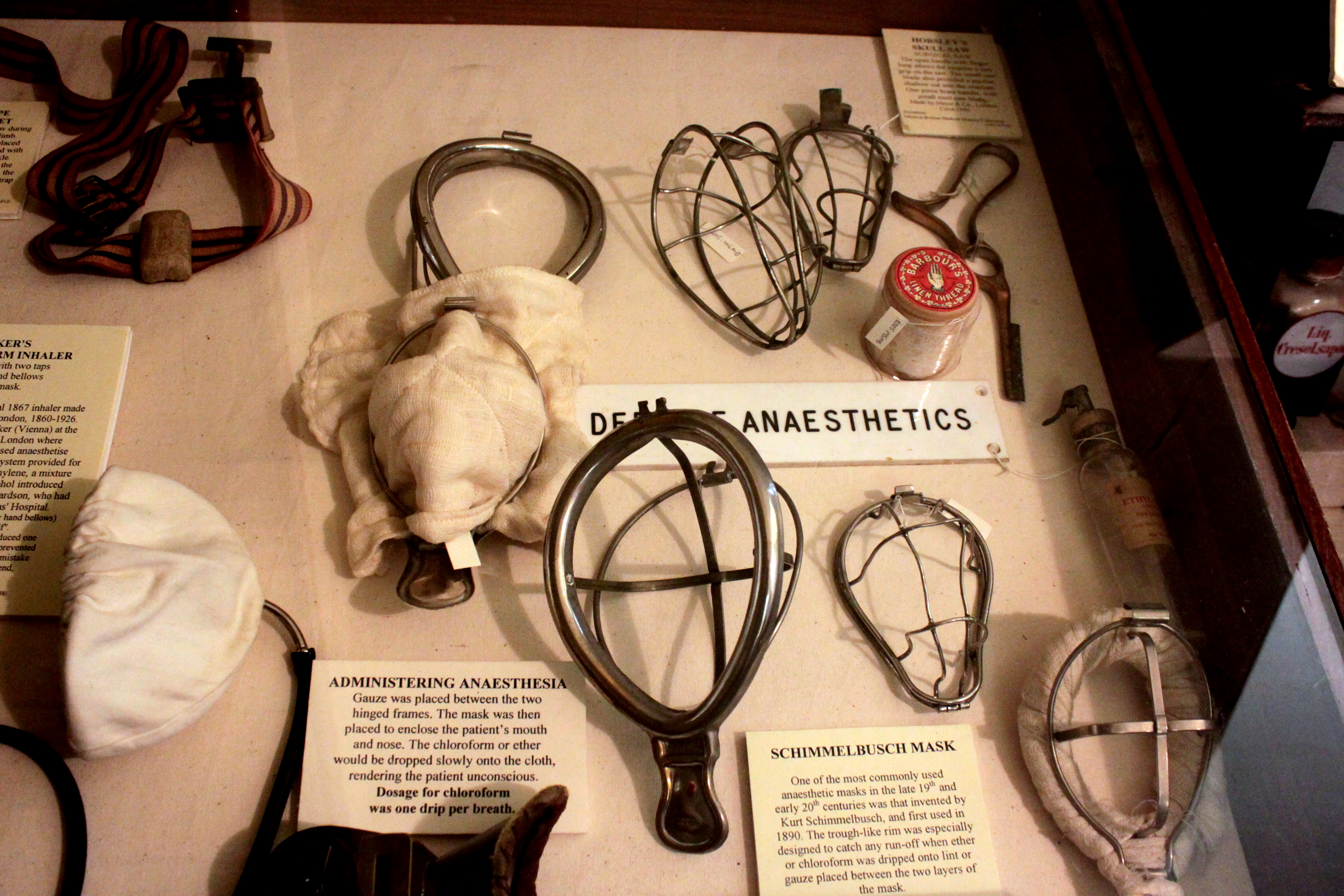
The Schimmelbusch mask

The Schimmelbusch mask is an open breathing system for delivering an anesthetic. The device was invented by Curt Schimmelbusch in 1889, and was used until the 1950s (though it is still applied in some developing countries). The device consists of a wire frame which is covered with several beds of gauze and applied to the patient's face over the mouth and nose. Then high-volatility anesthetic (usually diethyl ether or halothane, and historically chloroform) is dripped on it, allowing the patient to inhale a mix of the evaporated anesthetic and air. The device is designed to prevent the anesthetic from coming in contact with the patient's skin, where it can cause irritation.
