= Adjustable pressure-limiting valve =

Flow control valve used in anaesthesiology

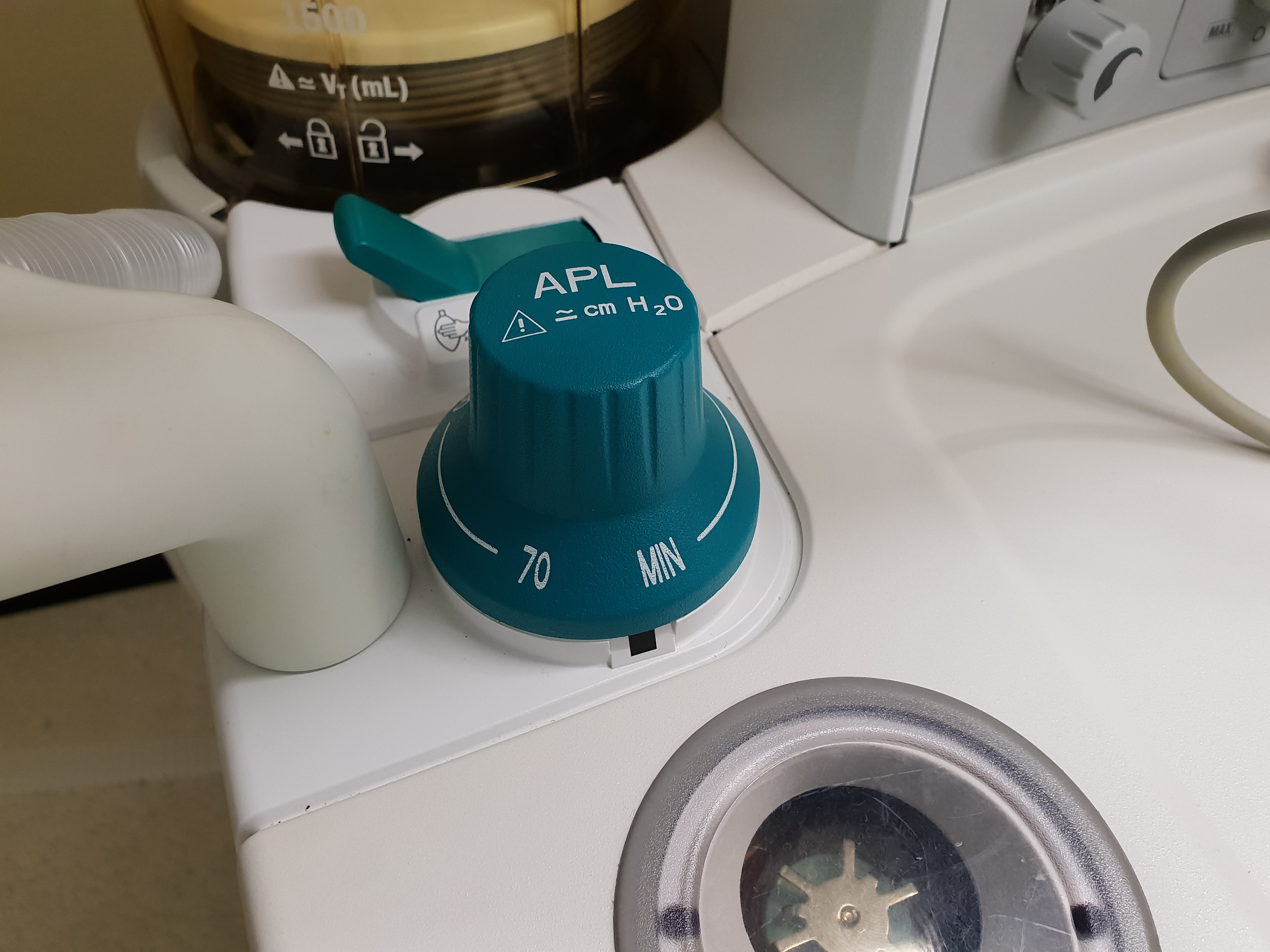
The adjustable pressure-limiting valve on a General Electric Datex-Ohmeda Aisys anaesthetic machine, with pressure gradations shown in centimetres of water

An adjustable pressure-limiting valve (commonly abbreviated to APL valve, and also referred to as an expiratory valve, relief valve or spill valve) is a type of flow control valve used in anaesthesiology as part of a breathing system. It allows excess fresh gas flow and exhaled gases to leave the system while preventing ambient air from entering.

== Mechanism ==
Such valves were first described by the American dentist Jay Heidbrink, who used a thin disc that was held in place by a spring. The valve is adjustable and spring-loaded, allowing the opening pressure of the valve to be controlled by screwing the valve top which modifies the pressure on the spring. A very light spring is used, so that at its minimum setting the valve can be opened by the patient's breathing alone using low pressures. In contemporary APL valves, three orifices or "ports" are present: one for intake of gas, one for return of gas to the patient, and an exhaust port for waste gas which can be connected to a scavenging system.
