= Breathing circuit =

Conduit that allows breathing gases to pass to and from the user

A breathing circuit is those parts of a breathing apparatus (or breathing system), which direct the flow of supplied breathing gas to, and sometimes from, the user. The breathing circuit may be open, closed, or semi-closed, depending on whether breathing gas is recycled. A closed or semi-closed circuit will include components which remove carbon dioxide from the exhaled gas and add oxygen before it is delivered for inhalation, so that the mixture remains stable and suitable for supporting life. Terminology may vary slightly between fields of application. In diving and industrial rebreathers, the closed or semi-closed breathing circuit may also be called the loop, or breathing loop. In medical equipment the closed or semi-closed circuit may be called the circle system.

A medical breathing system or medical breathing circuit is a medical device used to deliver oxygen, remove carbon dioxide, and deliver inhalational anaesthetic agents to a patient. Originally developed for use in anaesthesiology, many variants of breathing system are in clinical use, but most comprise a source of fresh gas flow, a length of breathing tubing to direct the gas, an adjustable pressure limiting valve to control pressure within the system and direct waste away, and a reservoir bag to allow assisted ventilation.

== Types ==
=== Medical ===
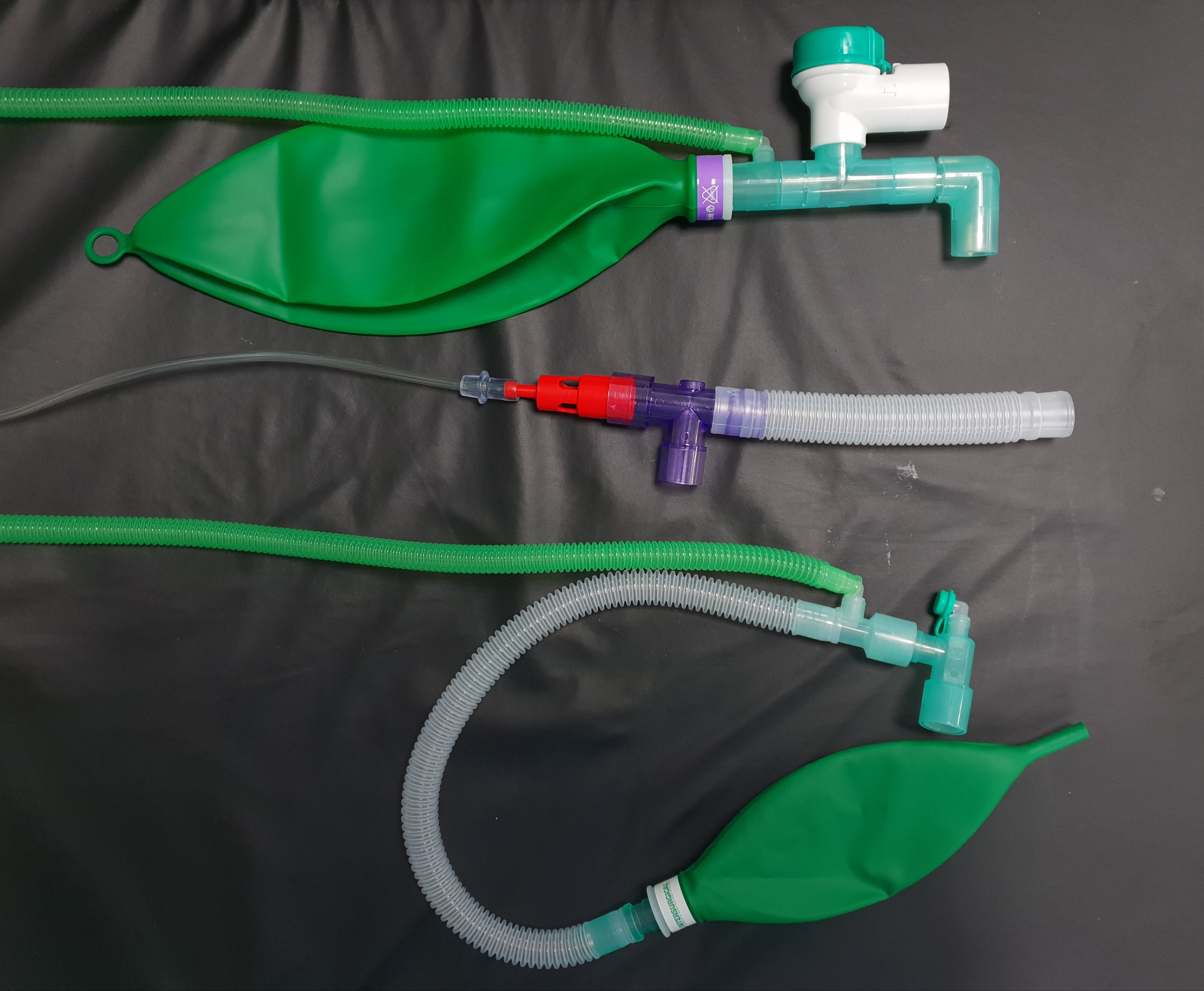
Examples of commercially available anaesthetic breathing systems. From top to bottom: a Mapleson C system manufactured by Intersurgical; a Mapleson E system, to which a red Venturi valve has been fitted so as to reduce the delivered oxygen concentration; and a Mapleson F system manufactured by Intersurgical.

There are many forms of breathing system, each having somewhat different mechanisms of action. They have traditionally been classified by the way in which the system interacts with fresh air from the surrounding atmosphere, and by whether the patient rebreathes gases that they have previously exhaled. However, there is no international standard for classifying breathing systems, and the terms "semi-open" and "semi-closed" may cause confusion in particular between US and British usage. Strictly speaking, the term "circuit" is only accurate in the case of closed systems where the breathed gas completes a full circuit. However, underwater and industrial breathing apparatus are routinely classified as "open circuit" when there is no recycling of exhaled gas.

- Open systems use unrestricted ambient air as the source of fresh gas, with no boundary between the patient's airway and the atmosphere. Purely open systems - for instance, gauze soaked in ether by the open-drop technique and held near the patient's face - are archaic and are no longer in clinical use. They have no reservoir and no rebreathing takes place.
- Semi-open systems such as the Schimmelbusch mask use ambient air as the fresh gas source, but incorporate some sort of apparatus or reservoir that restricts the supply by creating a partial boundary with the atmosphere. No rebreathing occurs.
- Semi-closed systems have a full boundary with the surrounding atmosphere, and use a controlled source for fresh gas flow. Intake of ambient air is prevented, but excess fresh gas is vented into the surrounding atmosphere. Partial rebreathing of exhaled gas can occur. They are commonly subdivided using the Mapelson classification (see below).
- Closed systems have a totally closed boundary across which no gas enters or is vented, meaning that complete rebreathing takes place. The commonest example is the circle system.

==== Mapleson classification ====
The British physicist and physiologist William Mapleson developed a classification in 1954 which divided semi-closed breathing systems into five groups named A to E, with a sixth group F subsequently being added. They include a reservoir that can hold fresh gas, exhaled gas, or a mix of both depending on the system and the mode of ventilation. They vary in their efficiency, in that some need wastefully higher fresh gas flows in certain situations to ensure that carbon dioxide is removed safely, avoiding rebreathing that can lead to hypercapnia. Those classified as Mapleson A are the most efficient for unassisted continuous spontaneous ventilation, while D, E and F systems are more efficient for assisted ventilation.

- Mapleson A systems, also known as Magill systems, are efficient for spontaneous ventilation, but inefficient for controlled ventilation as high gas flows will be needed to avoid the patient rebreathing the air that has just left the lungs. A Lack system is a coaxial modification of the Mapleson A system.
- Mapleson B and Mapleson C systems are essentially the same, with the B circuit having longer tubing than the C circuit. They are inefficient for both spontaneous and controlled ventilation, as they require high gas flows to prevent rebreathing. The B circuit is not in clinical use, but the C circuit is commonly used during patient transfer and in resuscitation as it is compact. The Waters bag, developed by Ralph Waters, comprises a C system with an attached soda lime absorption canister to remove exhaled carbon dioxide, meaning that exhaled gases can safely be rebreathed.
- Mapleson D systems are inefficient for spontaneous ventilation due to needing high gas flows to prevent rebreathing, but are efficient for controlled ventilation. A Bain system is a coaxial modification of the Mapleson D system.
- Mapleson E systems, also known as Ayre's T-piece, are used in anaesthesia for children. The reservoir consists of a length of tubing; if this is short, then the system functions more like an open system. They have no valves or reservoir bag, meaning they have low resistance to spontaneous breathing. They are inefficient as they require high gas flows.
- Mapleson F systems are also used for children, and consist of an adapted Mapleson E system to which a reservoir bag has been added to the tubing - this is called the "Jackson-Rees modification", after Gordon Jackson Rees. This allows both spontaneous and controlled ventilation, as well as the application of continuous positive airway pressure.

The Humphrey ADE is a multifunctional breathing system which can be converted into a type A, D or E system depending on the requirements by flipping a lever to change the order of the fresh gas, reservoir and valves. It therefore can be optimised to allow efficient spontaneous or controlled ventilation in both children and adults.

==== Circle systems ====
Circle systems are breathing systems that incorporate a carbon dioxide scrubber and a series of one-way valves, meaning that gases expired by the patient can be reused without risk of carbon dioxide accumulation. This means that they can use fresh gas and inhalational anaesthetic agents very efficiently, and they cause little pollution if waste gas is not expelled to the environment. They can be used as totally closed systems, where the fresh gas flow matches the oxygen and anaesthetic uptake, exhaled carbon dioxide is absorbed, and there is no expired gas. They can also be used as semi-closed systems, with a higher gas flow, with some gas exiting through the expiratory valve. The higher the gas flow, the faster is the response to changes in anaesthetic concentration. Totally closed systems respond very slowly to changes in anaesthetic concentration. They require a high initial gas flow in order to prime the full volume of the system with the desired concentration of gases, and a similarly high flow to allow patients to wake up. John Snow described a closed circuit device in 1850. Several circle systems are described in the 1945 edition of Textbook of Anaesthetics by R. J. Minnitt and John Gillies
