= Curt Schimmelbusch =

German physician and pathologist (1860–1895)

- Born: 16 November 1860; Groß-Nogath
- Died: 2 August 1895 (aged 34); Berlin
- Scientific career
- Fields: Anaesthesia; Asepsis

Curt Theodor Schimmelbusch (16 November 1860 – 2 August 1895) was a German physician and pathologist who invented the Schimmelbusch mask, for the safe delivery of anaesthetics to surgical patients. He was also a key figure in the development of mechanical methods of sterilisation and disinfection for surgical procedures, on which his Anleitung zur aseptischen Wundbehandlung ("Guide to the aseptic treatment of wounds") was considered a seminal work.

== Early life ==
Schimmelbusch was born in Groß-Nogath, West Prussia, (located in modern-day Poland) on 16 November 1860. After initially studying natural sciences, he then studied medicine at Würzburg, Göttingen, Berlin and Halle. He was awarded his medical degree in 1886, while at Halle, where he worked with Karl Joseph Eberth. During his time at Halle, he assisted Eberth with his work on thrombosis, and the pair published a number of papers together. In 1888, he worked with Bernhard Bardenheuer in a hospital in Cologne, and in the following year, he moved back to Berlin and conducted research at the institute at the Ziegelstrasse.

== Schimmelbusch mask ==
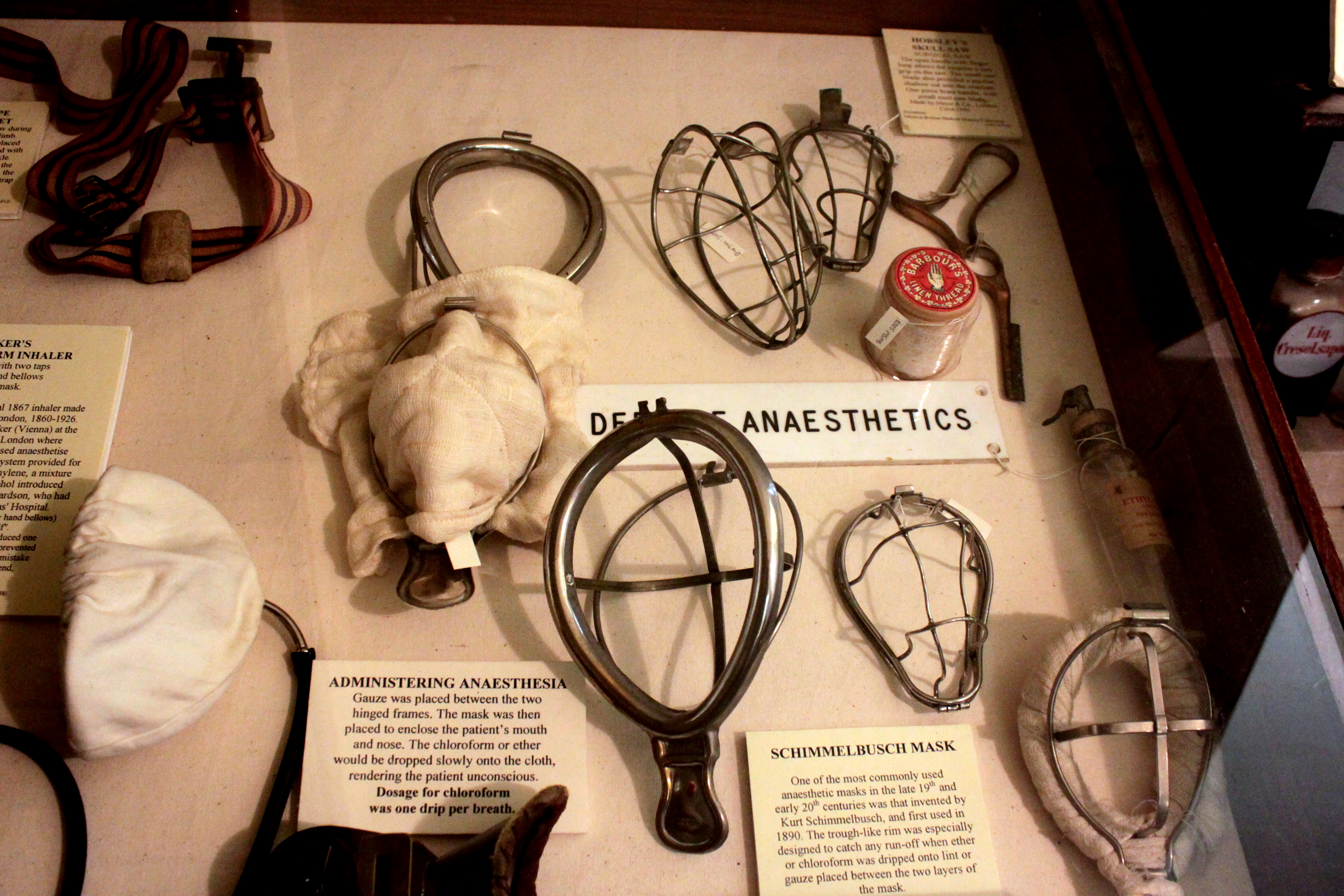
Schimmelbusch invented a mask in 1890 to allow safer anaesthetisation of patients.

In 1890, Schimmelbusch invented a mask for the delivery of anaesthetics to surgical patients. It was primarily designed for ether anaesthesia, but he also proposed its use for chloroform anaesthesia. Both ether and chloroform can cause irritation if they come into contact with the patient's skin, so Schimmelbusch designed a metal mask, over which a gauze could be stretched and secured. The mask was placed over the patient's mouth and nose, and anaesthetic was applied to the gauze, allowing the patient to inhale the anaesthetic as they breathed normally. Around the edge of the mask, a trough collected the residual anaesthetic, rather than allowing it to drip onto the patient's face.

Schimmelbusch developed an updated version of the mask in 1895, in which the wire created a tower-like shape, which was covered in a waxed cloth in order to concentrate the anaesthetic vapour. However, the updated mask was not a success, and his original design, with modifications to allow gas channels remained in use in the German-speaking world into the 1950s. The continued use of the mask was due to a combination of factors; a number of influential surgeons spurned the use of tracheal intubation for anaesthesia, and the mask did not require as much training to use. As a consequence, anaesthesia was generally applied by relatively inexperienced doctors and nurses.

== Work on aseptic techniques ==
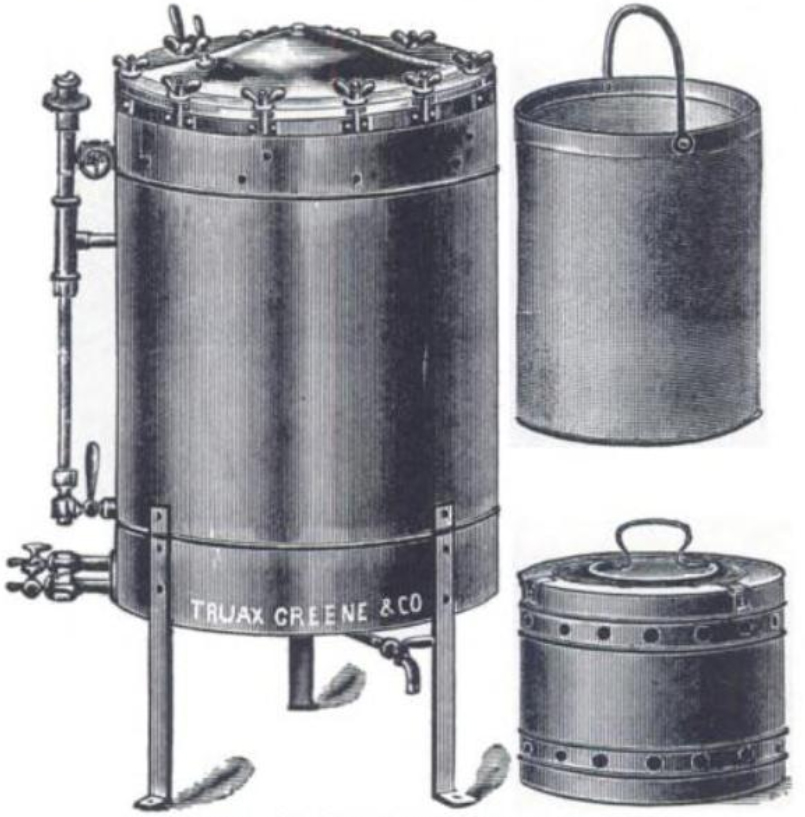
Schimmelbusch's steam steriliser

Ernst von Bergmann hired Schimmelbusch in 1889, having been impressed with his work on bacteriology. Bergmann used a number of methods of disinfection and sterilisation, which Schimmelbusch documented and formalised. He referred to the equipment and methods used as the "aseptic apparatus", and in 1892, published Anleitung zur aseptischen Wundbehandlung ("Guide to the aseptic treatment of wounds"), which became a seminal work on the subject. In Bergmann's obituary of Schimmelbusch, he wrote that the treatise "had been translated into almost all European languages and its procedures had spread worldwide." The procedures were heavily based upon the work of Robert Koch and Hugo Davidsohn, and combined Koch's technique of removing anthrax spores to disinfect, along with hand sanitation methods proposed by Paul Fürbringer and heat sterilisation of surgical instruments. Although these practices were already used in laboratories, Bergmann and Schimmelbusch were among the first to apply them in a surgical setting.

Schimmelbusch proposed that medical dressings should be sterilised daily, prior to surgery, and that they should remain in the same vessel until their use. He noted that items described as sterile that arrived from a factory or pharmacy were often contaminated, resulting in the need to conduct sterilisation in the hospital. To achieve this, he proposed a variation on the designs of autoclave that already existed, in which items should be sterilised for twenty to thirty minutes. He also designed several storage boxes which could hold the instruments inside the autoclave, and then be closed so that the instruments could be transported to the location of the operation without being contaminated. The boxes had sliding bands to open or close gaps to allow steam or prevent contaminants from entering the box.

== Death ==
Schimmelbusch died of tuberculosis on 2 August 1895 at the age of 34. His obituary in the British Medical Journal described him as "one of the most distinguished of the younger generation of surgeons in Berlin", and praised his work in the fields of thrombosis and aseptic techniques.

== Works ==
- Die Blutplättchen und die Blutgerinnung. Berlin: Druck und Verlag von Georg Reimer. 1885. OCLC 213007861.
- Ueber Thrombose im gerinnungsunfähigen Blute. Halle: S. Kaemmerer. 1886. OCLC 257287530.
- Die Thrombose nach Versuchen und Leichenbefunden (with Karl Joseph Eberth). Stuttgart: Enke. 1888. OCLC 11368987.
- Ueber multiples Auftreten primärer Carcinome. 1890. OCLC 37676134.
- Anleitung zur aseptischen Wundbehandlung [Guide to the aseptic treatment of wounds]. Berlin: A. Hirschwald. 1892. OCLC 11295766.
- Das Cystadenom der mamma. Berlin. 1892. OCLC 7102824.
- Über grünen Eiter und die pathogene Bedeutung des Bacillus pyocyaneus. Leipzig: Breitkopf & Härtel. 1893. OCLC 313490956.

== Bibliography ==
- Schüttler, Jürgen (2012). 50th Anniversary of the German Society for Anaesthesiology and Intensive Care Medicine. Berlin: Springer-Verlag. ISBN 978-3-540-24257-4.
