= Nitrous oxide =

Colourless non-flammable greenhouse gas

- Nitrous oxide's canonical forms

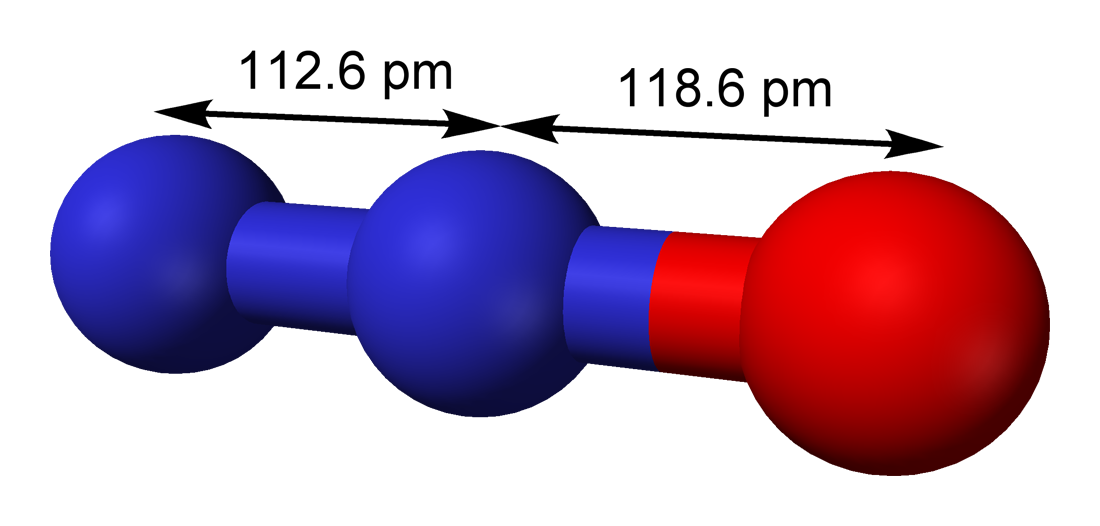
- Ball-and-stick model with bond lengths

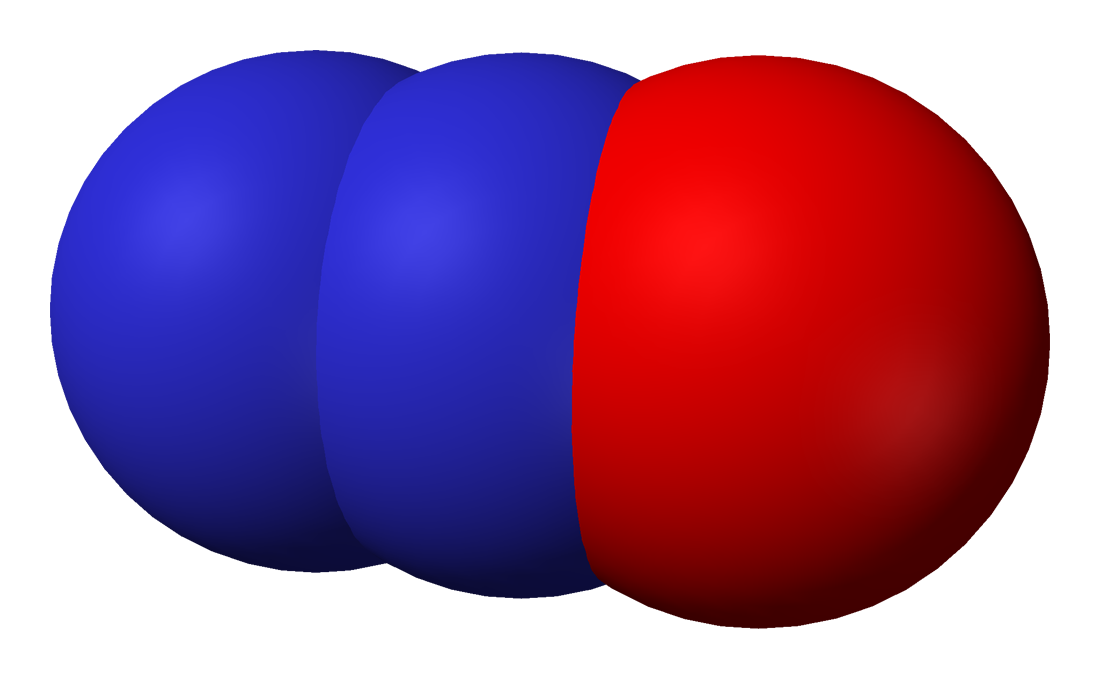
- Space-filling model of nitrous oxide

Names
- IUPAC names Nitrous oxide (not recommended) (Note: "Nitrous oxide" is not a recommended name because the -ous suffix means "full of". The word "nitrous" effectively means "full of nitrogen", but it does not specify a specific amount of nitrogen atoms, so "Nitrous oxide" could refer to N_{2}O, N_{3}O, N_{4}O, etc. Furthermore, there is no numerical prefix in front of "oxide", which could mean the term "Nitrous oxide" could refer to any compound with at least 2 nitrogen atoms and 1 oxygen atom, but this does not raise as much of a concern in chemistry compared to "nitrous".); Dinitrogen oxide (alternative name)
- Systematic IUPAC name Oxidodinitrogen(N—N)
- Other names: Laughing gas; galaxy gas; sweet air; nitrous; nos; nang; protoxide of nitrogen; hyponitrous oxide; dinitrogen oxide; dinitrogen monoxide; nitro

Identifiers
CAS Number	10024-97-2
3D model (JSmol)	Interactive image; Interactive image
Beilstein Reference	8137358
ChEBI	CHEBI:17045
ChEMBL	ChEMBL1234579
ChemSpider	923
DrugBank	DB06690
ECHA InfoCard	100.030.017
E number	E942 (glazing agents, ...)
Gmelin Reference	2153410
KEGG	D00102
PubChem CID	948
RTECS number	QX1350000
UNII	K50XQU1029
UN number	1070 (compressed); 2201 (liquid)
CompTox Dashboard (EPA)	DTXSID8021066
- InChI: InChI=1S/N2O/c1-2-3 Key: GQPLMRYTRLFLPF-UHFFFAOYSA-N; InChI=1/N2O/c1-2-3; InChI=1/N2O/c1-2-3 Key: GQPLMRYTRLFLPF-UHFFFAOYAP
- SMILES: N#[N+][O-]; [N-]=[N+]=O

Properties
Chemical formula	N_{2}O
Molar mass	44.013 g/mol
Appearance	colourless gas
Density	1.977 g/L (gas)
Melting point	−90.86 °C (−131.55 °F; 182.29 K)
Boiling point	−88.48 °C (−127.26 °F; 184.67 K)
Solubility in water	1.5 g/L (15 °C)
Solubility	soluble in alcohol, ether, sulfuric acid
log P	0.35
Vapor pressure	5150 kPa (20 °C)
Magnetic susceptibility (χ)	−18.9×10^{−6} cm^{3}/mol
Refractive index (n_{D})	1.000516 (0 °C, 101.325 kPa)
Viscosity	14.90 μPa·s

Structure
Molecular shape	linear, C_{∞v}
Dipole moment	0.166 D

Thermochemistry
Std molar entropy (S^{⦵}_{298})	219.96 J/(K·mol)
Std enthalpy of formation (Δ_{f}H^{⦵}_{298})	+82.05 kJ/mol

Pharmacology
ATC code	N01AX13 (WHO)
Routes of administration	Inhalation
- Pharmacokinetics
Metabolism	0.004%
Biological half-life	5 minutes
Excretion	Respiratory

Hazards
- GHS labelling
Pictograms	(GHS03: Oxidizing)
Signal word	Danger
Hazard statements	H270
Precautionary statements	P220, P244, P282, P317, P336, P370+P376, P403, P410+P403
NFPA 704 (fire diamond)	2 0 0 OX
Flash point	Nonflammable
Safety data sheet (SDS)	Ilo.org, ICSC 0067

Related compounds
Related nitrogen oxides	Nitric oxide Dinitrogen trioxide Nitrogen dioxide Dinitrogen tetroxide Dinitrogen pentoxide
Related compounds	Ammonium nitrate Azide
- Except where otherwise noted, data are given for materials in their standard state (at 25 °C [77 °F], 100 kPa). verify (what is ?) Infobox references

Nitrous oxide (dinitrogen oxide or dinitrogen monoxide), commonly known as laughing gas or nitrous, among others, is a chemical compound, an oxide of nitrogen with the formula N_{2}O. At room temperature, it is a colourless non-flammable gas, and has a slightly sweet scent and flavour. At elevated temperatures, nitrous oxide is a powerful oxidiser similar to molecular oxygen.

Nitrous oxide has significant medical uses, especially in surgery and dentistry, for its anaesthetic and pain-reducing effects, and it is on the World Health Organization's List of Essential Medicines. Its colloquial name, "laughing gas", coined by Humphry Davy, describes the euphoric effects upon inhaling it, which make it attractive as a recreational drug inducing a brief "high". It is known for its disassociative effects. When abused chronically, it may cause neurological damage through inactivation of vitamin B_{12}. It is also used as an oxidiser in rocket propellants and motor racing fuels, and as a frothing gas for whipped cream.

Nitrous oxide is also an atmospheric pollutant, with a concentration of 340 parts per billion (ppb) in 2026, increasing at 1 ppb annually. It is a major scavenger of stratospheric ozone, with an impact comparable to that of CFCs. About 40% of human-caused emissions are from agriculture, as nitrogen fertilisers are digested into nitrous oxide by soil micro-organisms. As the third most important greenhouse gas, nitrous oxide substantially contributes to global warming. Reduction of emissions is an important goal in the politics of climate change.

== Discovery and early use ==
The gas was first synthesised in 1772 by English natural philosopher and chemist Joseph Priestley who called it dephlogisticated nitrous air (see phlogiston theory) or inflammable nitrous air. Priestley published his discovery in the book Experiments and Observations on Different Kinds of Air (1775), where he described how to produce the preparation of "nitrous air diminished", by heating iron filings dampened with nitric acid.

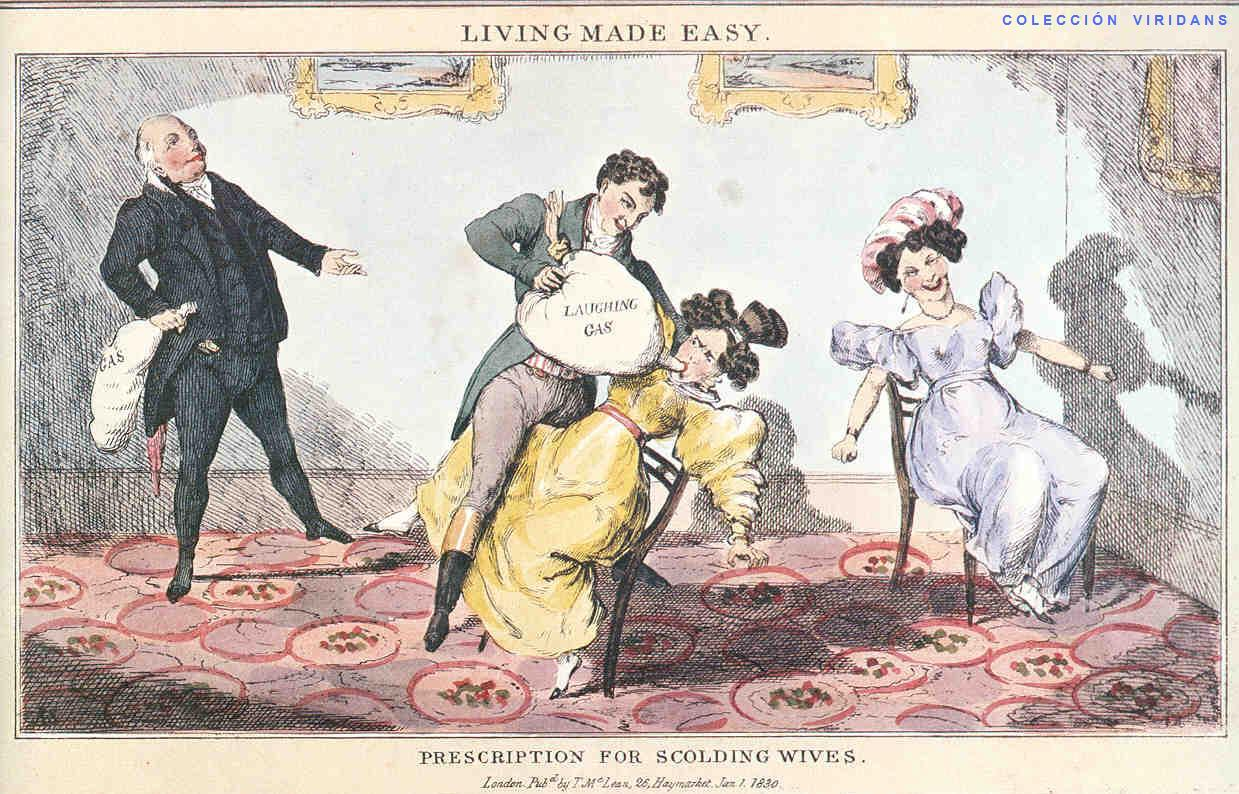
"Living Made Easy": A satirical print from 1830 depicting Humphry Davy administering a dose of laughing gas to a woman

The first important use of nitrous oxide was made possible by Thomas Beddoes and James Watt, who worked together to publish the book Considerations on the Medical Use and on the Production of Factitious Airs (1794). This book was important for two reasons. First, James Watt had invented a novel machine to produce "factitious airs" (including nitrous oxide) and a novel "breathing apparatus" to inhale the gas. Second, the book also presented the new medical theories by Thomas Beddoes, that tuberculosis and other lung diseases could be treated by inhalation of "Factitious Airs".

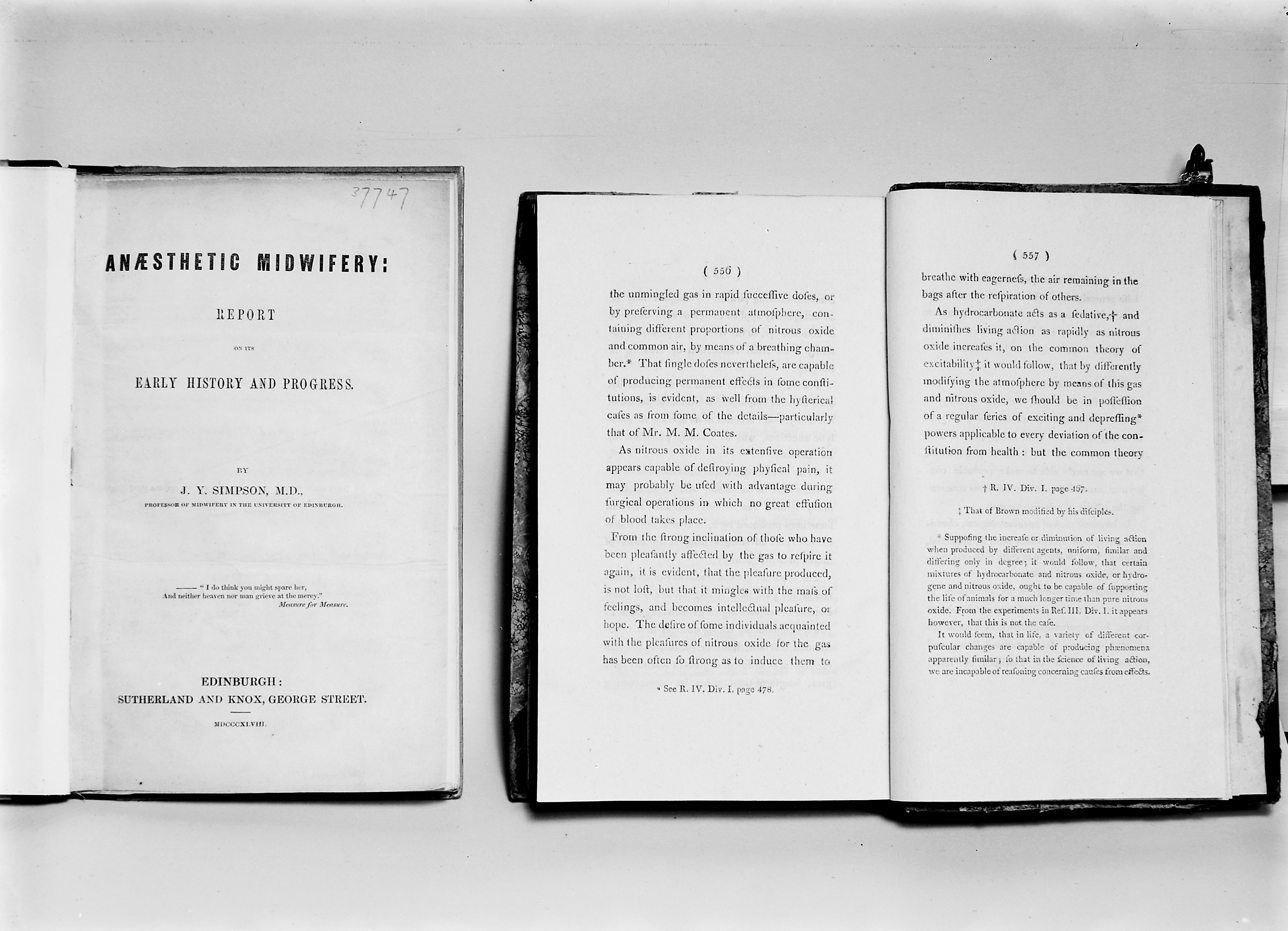
Sir Humphry Davy's Researches chemical and philosophical: chiefly concerning nitrous oxide (1800), pages 556 and 557 (right), outlining potential anaesthetic properties of nitrous oxide in relieving pain during surgery

The machine to produce "Factitious Airs" had three parts: a furnace to burn the needed material, a vessel with water where the produced gas passed through in a spiral pipe (for impurities to be "washed off"), and finally the gas cylinder with a gasometer where the gas produced, "air", could be tapped into portable air bags (made of airtight oily silk). The breathing apparatus consisted of one of the portable air bags connected with a tube to a mouthpiece. With this new equipment being engineered and produced by 1794, the way was paved for clinical trials, which began in 1798 when Thomas Beddoes established the "Pneumatic Institution for Relieving Diseases by Medical Airs" in Hotwells (Bristol). In the basement of the building, a large-scale machine was producing the gases under the supervision of a young Humphry Davy, who was encouraged to experiment with new gases for patients to inhale. The first important work of Davy was examination of the nitrous oxide, and the publication of his results in the book: Researches, Chemical and Philosophical (1800). In that publication, Davy notes the analgesic effect of nitrous oxide at page 465 and its potential to be used for surgical operations at page 556. Davy coined the name "laughing gas" for nitrous oxide.

Despite Davy's discovery that inhalation of nitrous oxide could relieve a conscious person from pain, another 44 years elapsed before doctors attempted to use it for anaesthesia. The use of nitrous oxide as a recreational drug at "laughing gas parties", primarily arranged for the British upper class, became an immediate success beginning in 1799. While the effects of the gas generally make the user appear stuporous, dreamy and sedated, some people also "get the giggles" in a state of euphoria, and frequently erupt in laughter.

One of the earliest commercial producers in the U.S. was George Poe, cousin of the poet Edgar Allan Poe, who also was the first to liquefy the gas.

The first time nitrous oxide was used as an anaesthetic drug in the treatment of a patient was when dentist Horace Wells, with assistance by Gardner Quincy Colton and John Mankey Riggs, demonstrated insensitivity to pain from a dental extraction on 11 December 1844. In the following weeks, Wells treated the first 12 to 15 patients with nitrous oxide in Hartford, Connecticut, and, according to his own record, only failed in two cases. In spite of these convincing results having been reported by Wells to the medical society in Boston in December 1844, this new method was not immediately adopted by other dentists. The reason for this was most likely that Wells, in January 1845 at his first public demonstration to the medical faculty in Boston, had been partly unsuccessful, leaving his colleagues doubtful regarding its efficacy and safety. The method did not come into general use until 1863, when Gardner Quincy Colton successfully started to use it in all his "Colton Dental Association" clinics, that he had just established in New Haven and New York City. Over the following three years, Colton and his associates successfully administered nitrous oxide to more than 25,000 patients. Today, nitrous oxide is used in dentistry as an anxiolytic, as an adjunct to local anaesthetic.

Nitrous oxide was not found to be a strong enough anaesthetic for use in major surgery in hospital settings. Instead, diethyl ether, being a stronger and more potent anaesthetic, was demonstrated and accepted for use in October 1846, along with chloroform in 1847. When Joseph Thomas Clover invented the "gas-ether inhaler" in 1876, it became a common practice at hospitals to initiate all anaesthetic treatments with a mild flow of nitrous oxide, and then gradually increase the anaesthesia with the stronger ether or chloroform. Clover's gas-ether inhaler was designed to supply the patient with nitrous oxide and ether at the same time, with the exact mixture being controlled by the operator of the device. It remained in use by many hospitals until the 1930s. Although hospitals today use a more advanced anaesthetic machine, these machines still use the same principle launched with Clover's gas-ether inhaler, to initiate the anaesthesia with nitrous oxide, before the administration of a more powerful anaesthetic.

Colton's popularisation of nitrous oxide led to its adoption by a number of less than reputable quacksalvers, who touted it as a cure for consumption, scrofula, catarrh and other diseases of the blood, throat and lungs. Nitrous oxide treatment was administered and licensed as a patent medicine by the likes of C. L. Blood and Jerome Harris in Boston and Charles E. Barney of Chicago.

== Chemical properties and reactions ==
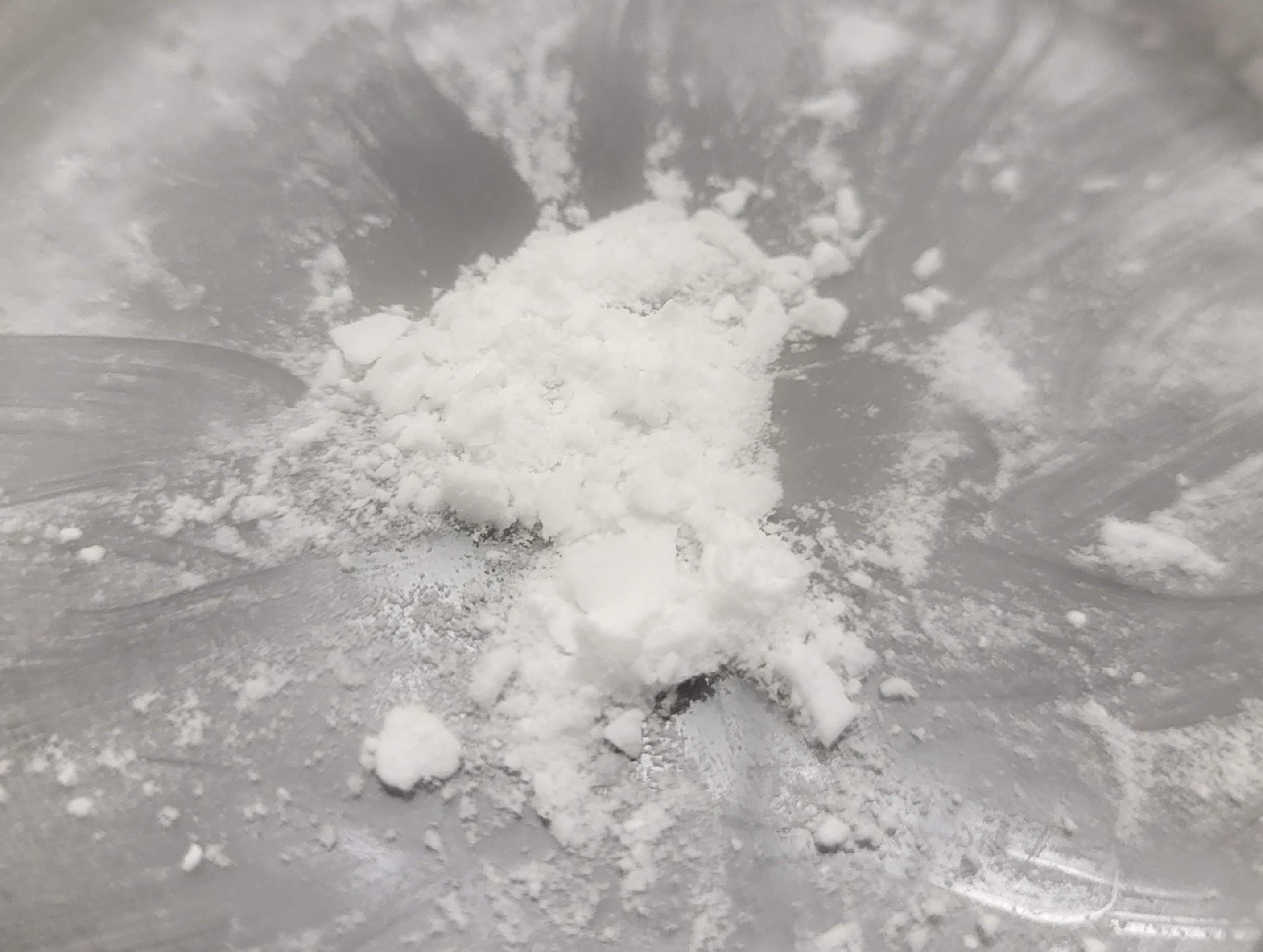
Solid nitrous oxide as a powder

Nitrous oxide is a colourless gas with a faint, sweet odour. It dissolves in water to give a neutral solution and does not react with water significantly. At −91 °C (−132 °F), nitrous oxide freezes to form a white solid.

Nitrous oxide supports combustion by releasing the dipolar bonded oxygen radical, and can thus relight a glowing splint.

N_{2}O is inert at room temperature and has few reactions. At elevated temperatures, its reactivity increases. For example, nitrous oxide reacts with NaNH_{2} at 187 °C (369 °F) to give NaN_{3}:

2 NaNH_{2} + N_{2}O → NaN_{3} + NaOH + NH_{3}

This reaction is the route adopted by the commercial chemical industry to produce azide salts, which are used as detonators.

== Mechanism of action ==
The pharmacological mechanism of action of inhaled N_{2}O is not fully known. However, it has been shown to directly modulate a broad range of ligand-gated ion channels, which likely plays a major role. It moderately blocks NMDAR and β_{2}-subunit-containing nACh channels, weakly inhibits AMPA, kainate, GABA_{A-ρ} and 5-HT_{3} receptors, and slightly potentiates GABA_{A} and glycine receptors. It also has been shown to activate two-pore-domain K^{+} channels. While N_{2}O affects several ion channels, its anaesthetic, hallucinogenic and euphoriant effects are likely caused mainly via inhibition of NMDA receptor-mediated currents. In addition to its effects on ion channels, N_{2}O may act similarly to nitric oxide (NO) in the central nervous system. Nitrous oxide is 30 to 40 times more soluble than nitrogen.

The effects of inhaling sub-anaesthetic doses of nitrous oxide may vary unpredictably with settings and individual differences; however, Jay (2008) suggests that it reliably induces the following states and sensations:

- Intoxication
- Euphoria/dysphoria
- Spatial disorientation
- Temporal disorientation
- Reduced pain sensitivity

A minority of users also experience uncontrolled vocalisations and muscular spasms. These effects generally disappear minutes after removal of the nitrous oxide source.

=== Anxiolytic effect ===
In behavioural tests of anxiety, a low dose of N_{2}O is an effective anxiolytic. This anti-anxiety effect is associated with enhanced activity of GABA_{A} receptors, as it is partially reversed by benzodiazepine site antagonists. Mirroring this, animals that have developed tolerance to the anxiolytic effects of benzodiazepines are partially tolerant to N_{2}O. In humans given 30% N_{2}O, benzodiazepine receptor antagonists reduced the subjective reports of feeling "high", but did not alter psychomotor performance.

=== Analgesic effect ===
The analgesic effects of N_{2}O are linked to the interaction between the endogenous opioid system and the descending noradrenergic system. When animals are given morphine chronically, they develop tolerance to its pain-killing effects, and this also renders the animals tolerant to the analgesic effects of N_{2}O. Administration of antibodies that bind and block the activity of some endogenous opioids (not β-endorphin) also block the antinociceptive effects of N_{2}O. Drugs that inhibit the breakdown of endogenous opioids also potentiate the antinociceptive effects of N_{2}O. Several experiments have shown that opioid receptor antagonists applied directly to the brain block the antinociceptive effects of N_{2}O, but these drugs have no effect when injected into the spinal cord.

Apart from an indirect action, nitrous oxide, like morphine also interacts directly with the endogenous opioid system by binding at opioid receptor binding sites.

Conversely, α_{2}-adrenoceptor antagonists block the pain-reducing effects of N_{2}O when given directly to the spinal cord, but not when applied directly to the brain. α_{2B}-adrenoceptor knockout mice or animals depleted in norepinephrine are nearly completely resistant to the antinociceptive effects of N_{2}O. Apparently N_{2}O-induced release of endogenous opioids causes disinhibition of brainstem noradrenergic neurons, which release norepinephrine into the spinal cord and inhibit pain signalling. Exactly how N_{2}O causes the release of endogenous opioid peptides remains uncertain.

== Production ==
Various methods of producing nitrous oxide are used.

=== Industrial methods ===
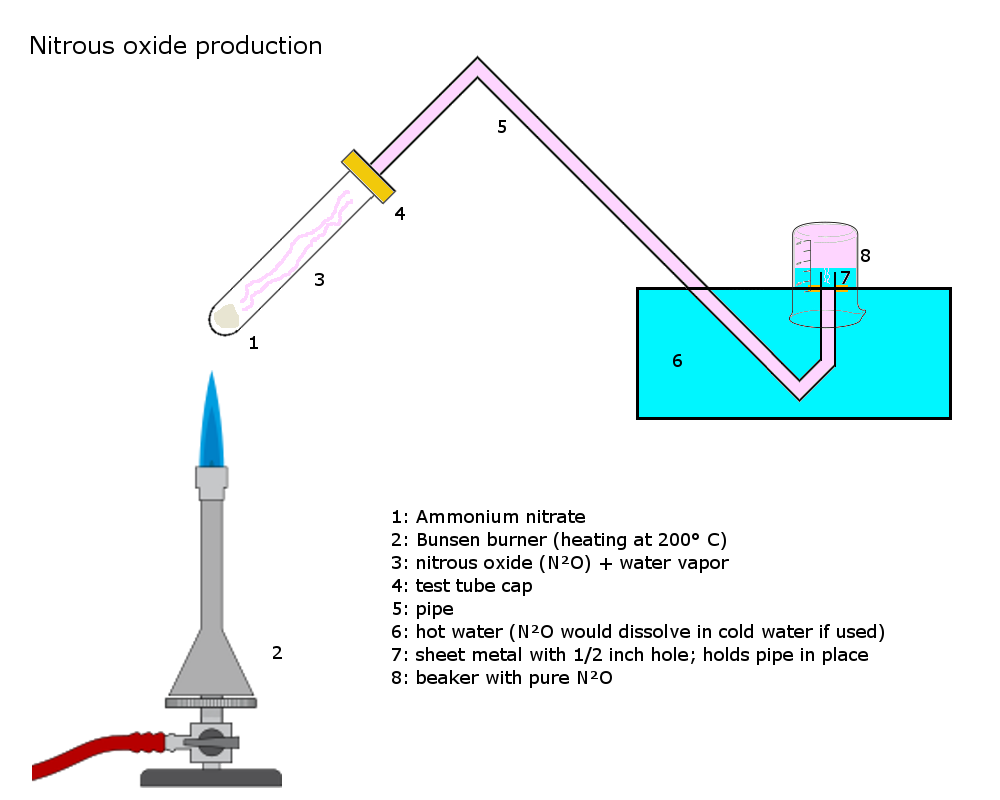
Nitrous oxide production

Nitrous oxide is prepared on an industrial scale by carefully heating ammonium nitrate at about 250 °C, which decomposes into nitrous oxide and water vapour.

NH_{4}NO_{3} → 2 H_{2}O + N_{2}O

The addition of various phosphate salts favours formation of a purer gas at slightly lower temperatures. This reaction may be difficult to control, resulting in detonation.

=== Laboratory methods ===
The decomposition of ammonium nitrate is also a common laboratory method for preparing the gas. Equivalently, it can be obtained by heating a mixture of sodium nitrate and ammonium sulfate:

2 NaNO_{3} + (NH_{4})_{2}SO_{4} → Na_{2}SO_{4} + 2 N_{2}O + 4 H_{2}O

Another method involves the reaction of urea, nitric acid and sulfuric acid:

2 (NH_{2})_{2}CO + 2 HNO_{3} + H_{2}SO_{4} → 2 N_{2}O + 2 CO_{2} + (NH_{4})_{2}SO_{4} + 2 H_{2}O

Direct oxidation of ammonia with a manganese dioxide-bismuth oxide catalyst has been reported: cf. Ostwald process.

2 NH_{3} + 2 O_{2} → N_{2}O + 3 H_{2}O

Hydroxylammonium chloride reacts with sodium nitrite to give nitrous oxide. If the nitrite is added to the hydroxylamine solution, the only remaining by-product is salt water. If the hydroxylamine solution is added to the nitrite solution (nitrite is in excess), however, then toxic higher oxides of nitrogen also are formed:

NH_{3}OHCl + NaNO_{2} → N_{2}O + NaCl + 2 H_{2}O

Treating HNO_{3} with SnCl_{2} and HCl also has been demonstrated:

2 HNO_{3} + 8 HCl + 4 SnCl_{2} → 5 H_{2}O + 4 SnCl_{4} + N_{2}O

Hyponitrous acid decomposes to N_{2}O and water with a half-life of 16 days at 25 °C at pH 1–3.

H_{2}N_{2}O_{2} → H_{2}O + N_{2}O

== Atmospheric occurrence ==
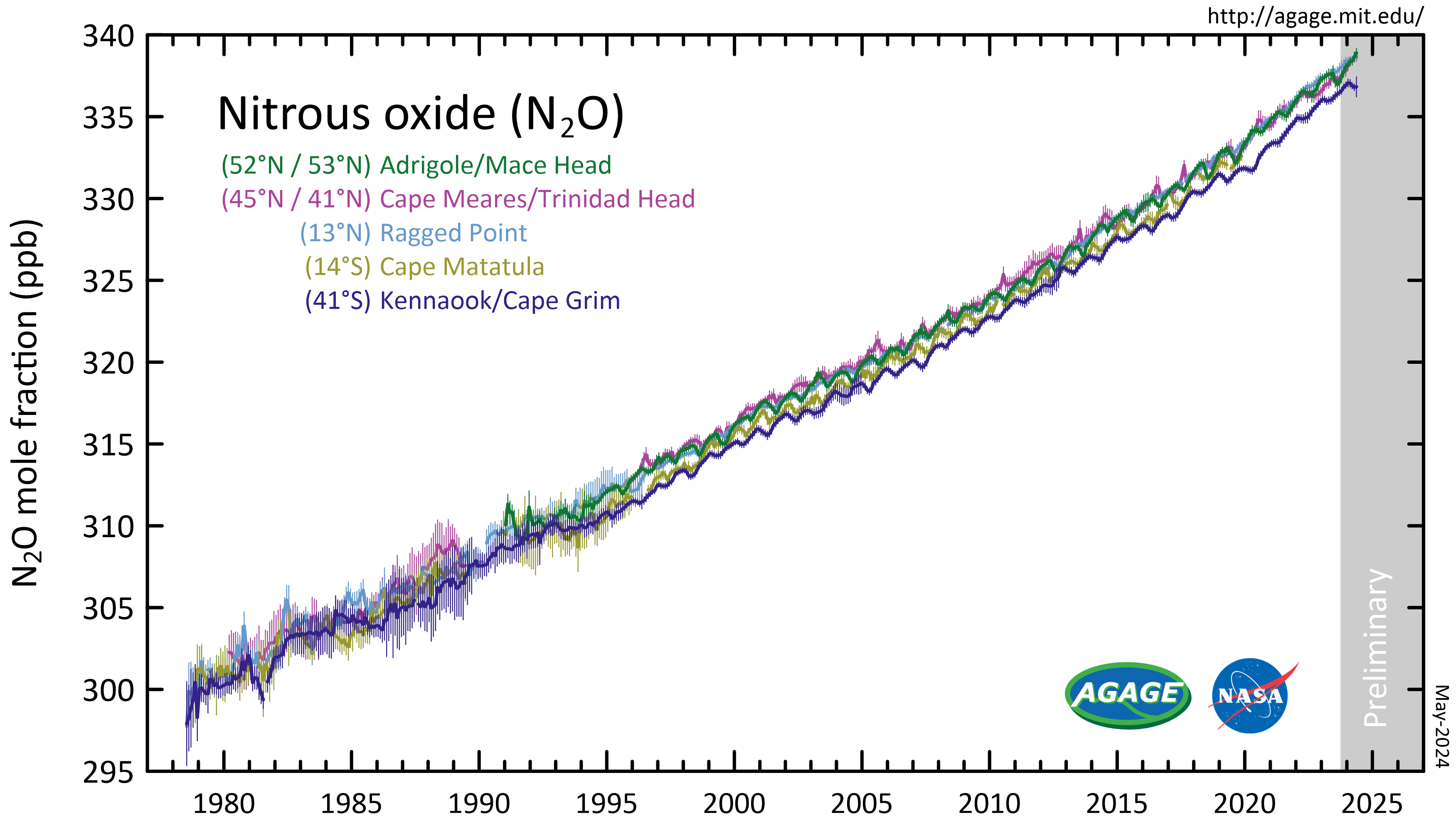
Nitrous oxide (N_{2}O) measured by the Advanced Global Atmospheric Gases Experiment (AGAGE) in the lower atmosphere (troposphere) at stations around the world. Abundances are given as pollution free monthly mean mole fractions in parts-per-billion.

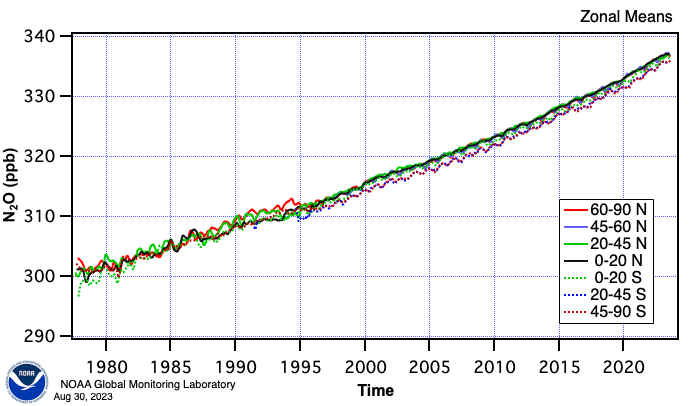
Nitrous oxide atmospheric concentration since 1978

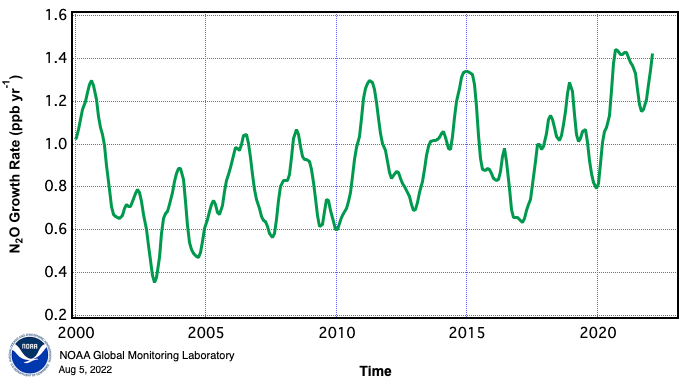
Annual growth rate of atmospheric nitrous oxide since 2000

Earth's nitrous oxide budget from the Global Carbon Project (2024)

Nitrous oxide is a minor component of Earth's atmosphere and is an active part of the planetary nitrogen cycle. Based on analysis of air samples gathered from sites around the world, its concentration surpassed 330 ppb in 2017 and 339 ppb in 2025. The growth rate of about 1 ppb per year has also accelerated during recent decades. Nitrous oxide's atmospheric abundance has grown more than 20% from a base level of about 270 ppb in 1750. Important atmospheric properties of N_{2}O are summarized in the following table:

Property	Value
Ozone depletion potential (ODP)	0.017 (CCl_{3}F = 1)
Global warming potential (GWP: 100-year)	273 (CO_{2} = 1)
Atmospheric lifetime	116 ± 9 years

In 2022 the IPCC reported that: "The human perturbation of the natural nitrogen cycle through the use of synthetic fertilizers and manure, as well as nitrogen deposition resulting from land-based agriculture and fossil fuel burning has been the largest driver of the increase in atmospheric N_{2}O of 31.0 ± 0.5 ppb (10%) between 1980 and 2019."

=== Emissions by source ===
17.0 (12.2 to 23.5) million tonnes total annual average nitrogen in N_{2}O was emitted in 2007–2016. N_{2}O is the third most important greenhouse gas for global warming and one of the most used ozone-depleting substance in the last century. About 40% of N_{2}O emissions are from humans and the rest are part of the natural nitrogen cycle. The N_{2}O emitted each year by humans has a greenhouse effect equivalent to about 3 billion tonnes of carbon dioxide: for comparison humans emitted 37 billion tonnes of actual carbon dioxide in 2019, and methane equivalent to 9 billion tonnes of carbon dioxide.

Most of the N_{2}O emitted into the atmosphere, from natural and anthropogenic sources, is produced by microorganisms such as denitrifying bacteria and fungi in soils and oceans. Soils under natural vegetation are an important source of nitrous oxide, accounting for 60% of all naturally produced emissions. Other natural sources include the oceans (35%) and atmospheric chemical reactions (5%). Wetlands can also be emitters of nitrous oxide. Emissions from thawing permafrost may be significant, but as of 2022 this is not certain.

The main components of anthropogenic emissions are fertilised agricultural soils and livestock manure (42%), runoff and leaching of fertilisers (25%), biomass burning (10%), fossil fuel combustion and industrial processes (10%), biological degradation of other nitrogen-containing atmospheric emissions (9%) and human sewage (5%). Agriculture enhances nitrous oxide production through soil cultivation, the use of nitrogen fertilisers and animal waste handling. These activities stimulate naturally occurring bacteria to produce more nitrous oxide. Nitrous oxide emissions from soil can be challenging to measure as they vary markedly over time and space, and the majority of a year's emissions may occur when conditions are favorable during "hot moments" and/or at favorable locations known as "hotspots".

Among industrial emissions, the production of nitric acid and adipic acid are the largest sources of nitrous oxide emissions. The adipic acid emissions specifically arise from the degradation of the nitrolic acid intermediate derived from the nitration of cyclohexanone.

Nitrous oxide emissions

Nitrous oxide agriculture

=== Biological processes ===
Microbial processes that generate nitrous oxide may be classified as nitrification and denitrification. Specifically, they include:

- aerobic autotrophic nitrification, the stepwise oxidation of ammonia (NH_{3}) to nitrite (NO^{−}_{2}) and to nitrate (NO^{−}_{3})
- anaerobic heterotrophic denitrification, the stepwise reduction of NO^{−}_{3} to NO^{−}_{2}, nitric oxide (NO), N_{2}O and ultimately N_{2}, where facultative anaerobe bacteria use NO^{−}_{3} as an electron acceptor in the respiration of organic material in the condition of insufficient oxygen (O_{2})
- nitrifier denitrification, which is carried out by autotrophic NH_{3}-oxidising bacteria and the pathway whereby ammonia (NH_{3}) is oxidised to nitrite (NO^{−}_{2}), followed by the reduction of NO^{−}_{2} to nitric oxide (NO), N_{2}O and molecular nitrogen (N_{2})
- heterotrophic nitrification
- aerobic denitrification by the same heterotrophic nitrifiers
- fungal denitrification
- non-biological chemodenitrification

These processes are affected by soil chemical and physical properties such as the availability of mineral nitrogen and organic matter, acidity and soil type, as well as climate-related factors such as soil temperature and water content.

The emission of the gas to the atmosphere is limited greatly by its consumption inside the cells, by a process catalysed by the enzyme nitrous oxide reductase.

== Uses ==
=== Rocket motors ===
Nitrous oxide may be used as an oxidiser in a rocket motor. Compared to other oxidisers, it is much less toxic and more stable at room temperature, making it easier to store and safer to carry on a flight. Its high density and low storage pressure (when maintained at low temperatures) make it highly competitive with stored high-pressure gas systems.

In a 1914 patent, American rocket pioneer Robert Goddard suggested nitrous oxide and gasoline as possible propellants for a liquid-fuelled rocket. Nitrous oxide has been the oxidiser of choice in several hybrid rocket designs (using solid fuel with a liquid or gaseous oxidiser). The combination of nitrous oxide with hydroxyl-terminated polybutadiene fuel has been used by SpaceShipOne and others. It also is notably used in amateur and high power rocketry with various plastics as the fuel.

Nitrous oxide may also be used as a monopropellant. In the presence of a heated catalyst at a temperature of 577 °C (1,071 °F), N_{2}O decomposes exothermically into nitrogen and oxygen. Because of the large heat release, the catalytic action rapidly becomes secondary, as thermal autodecomposition becomes dominant. In a vacuum thruster, this may provide a monopropellant specific impulse (I_{sp}) up to 180 s. While noticeably less than the I_{sp} available from hydrazine thrusters (monopropellant, or bipropellant with dinitrogen tetroxide), the decreased toxicity makes nitrous oxide a worthwhile option.

The ignition of nitrous oxide depends critically on pressure. It deflagrates at approximately 600 °C (1,112 °F) at a pressure of 309 psi (21 atmospheres). At 600 psi, the required ignition energy is only 6 joules, whereas at 130 psi a 2,500-joule ignition energy input is insufficient.

=== Internal combustion engine ===
In vehicle racing, nitrous oxide (often called "nitrous" in this context) increases engine power by providing more oxygen during combustion, thus allowing the engine to burn more fuel. It is an oxidising agent roughly equivalent to hydrogen peroxide, and much stronger than molecular oxygen. Nitrous oxide is not flammable at low pressure/temperature, but at about 300 °C (572 °F), its breakdown delivers more oxygen than atmospheric air. It often is mixed with another fuel that is easier to deflagrate.

Nitrous oxide is stored as a compressed liquid. In an engine intake manifold, the evaporation and expansion of the liquid causes a large drop in intake charge temperature, resulting in a denser charge and allowing more air/fuel mixture to enter the cylinder. Sometimes nitrous oxide is injected into (or prior to) the intake manifold, whereas other systems directly inject it just before the cylinder (direct port injection).

The technique was used during World War II by Luftwaffe aircraft with the GM-1 system to boost the power output of aircraft engines. Originally meant to provide the Luftwaffe standard aircraft with superior high-altitude performance, technological considerations limited its use to extremely high altitudes. Accordingly, it was only used by specialised planes such as high-altitude reconnaissance aircraft, high-speed bombers and high-altitude interceptor aircraft. It sometimes could be found on Luftwaffe aircraft also fitted with another engine-boost system, MW 50, a form of water injection for aviation engines that used methanol for its boost capabilities.

One of the major problems of nitrous oxide oxidant in a reciprocating engine is excessive power: if the mechanical structure of the engine is not properly reinforced, it may be severely damaged or destroyed. It is important with nitrous oxide augmentation of petrol engines to maintain proper and evenly spread operating temperatures and fuel levels to prevent pre-ignition (also called detonation or spark knock). However, most problems associated with nitrous oxide come not from excessive power but from excessive pressure, since the gas builds up a much denser charge in the cylinder. The increased pressure and temperature can melt, crack, or warp the piston, valve, and cylinder head.

Automotive-grade liquid nitrous oxide differs slightly from medical-grade. A small amount of sulfur dioxide (SO_{2}) is added to prevent substance abuse.

=== Aerosol propellant for food ===
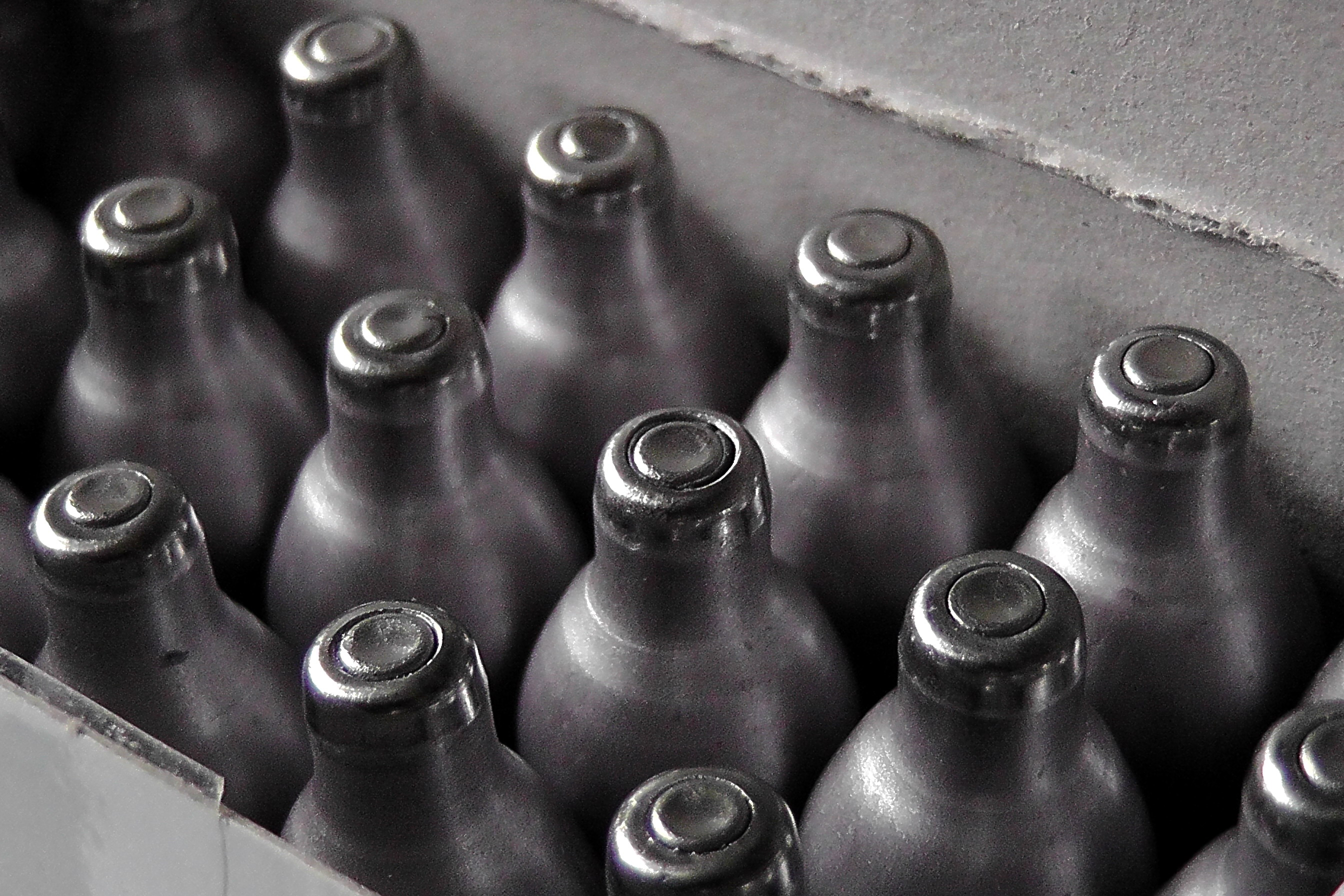
Food-grade N_{2}O whipped-cream chargers

The gas is approved for use as a food additive (E number: E942), specifically as an aerosol spray propellant. It is commonly used in aerosol whipped cream canisters and cooking sprays.

The gas is extremely soluble in fatty compounds. In pressurised aerosol whipped cream, it is dissolved in the fatty cream until it leaves the can, when it becomes gaseous and thus creates foam. This produces whipped cream four times the volume of the liquid, whereas whipping air into cream only produces twice the volume. Unlike air, nitrous oxide inhibits rancidification of the butterfat. Carbon dioxide cannot be used for whipped cream because it is acidic in water, which would curdle the cream and give it a seltzer-like "sparkle".

Extra-frothed whipped cream produced with nitrous oxide is unstable, and will return to liquid within half an hour to one hour. Thus, it is not suitable for decorating food that will not be served immediately.

Also, cooking spray, made from various oils with lecithin emulsifier, may use nitrous oxide propellant, or alternatively food-grade alcohol or propane.

=== Medical ===
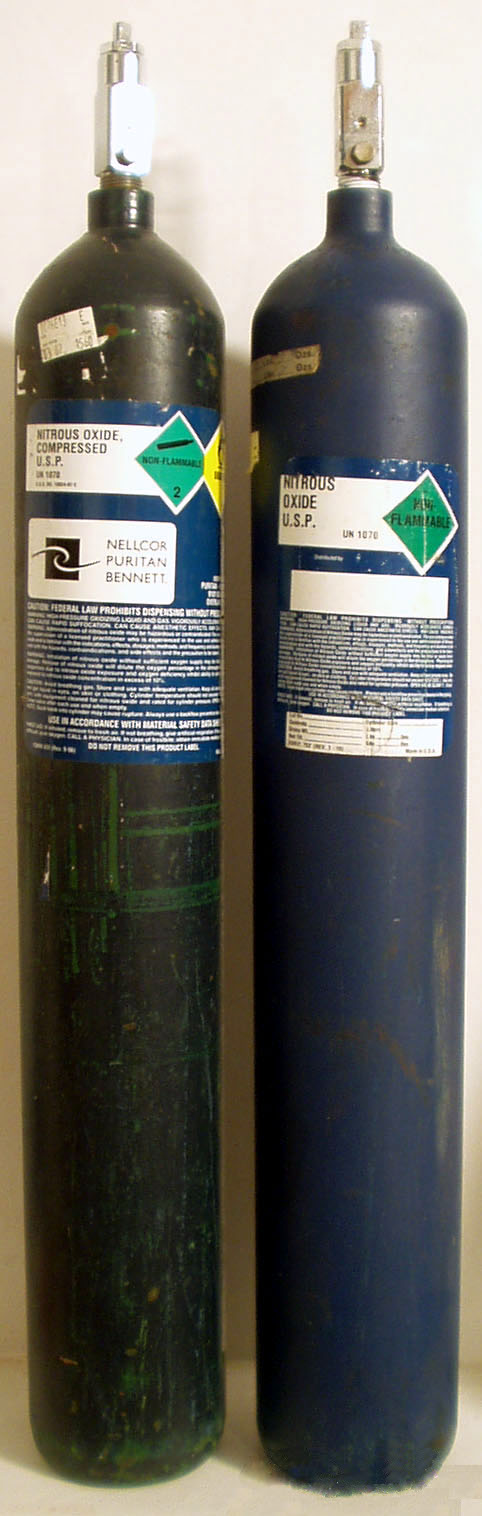
Medical-grade N_{2}O tanks used in dentistry

Nitrous oxide has been used in dentistry and surgery, as an anaesthetic and analgesic, since 1844. In the early days, the gas was administered through simple inhalers consisting of a breathing bag made of rubber cloth. Today, the gas is administered in hospitals by means of an automated relative analgesia machine, with an anaesthetic vaporiser and a medical ventilator, that delivers a precisely dosed and breath-actuated flow of nitrous oxide mixed with oxygen in a 2:1 ratio.

Nitrous oxide is a weak general anaesthetic, and so is generally not used alone in general anaesthesia, but used as a carrier gas (mixed with oxygen) for more powerful general anaesthetic drugs such as sevoflurane or desflurane. It has a minimum alveolar concentration of 105% and a blood/gas partition coefficient of 0.46. The use of nitrous oxide in anaesthesia can increase the risk of postoperative nausea and vomiting.

Dentists use a simpler machine which only delivers an N_{2}O and O_{2} mixture for the patient to inhale while conscious but must still be a recognised purpose designed dedicated relative analgesic flowmeter with a minimum 30% of oxygen at all times and a maximum upper limit of 70% nitrous oxide. The patient is kept conscious throughout the procedure, and retains adequate mental faculties to respond to questions and instructions from the dentist.

Inhalation of nitrous oxide is used frequently to relieve pain associated with childbirth, trauma, oral surgery and acute coronary syndrome (including heart attacks). Its use during labour has been shown to be a safe and effective aid for laboring women. Its use for acute coronary syndrome is of unknown benefit.

In Canada and the UK, Entonox and Nitronox are used commonly by ambulance crews (including unregistered practitioners) as rapid and highly effective analgesic gas.

Fifty percent nitrous oxide can be considered for use by trained non-professional first aid responders in prehospital settings, given the relative ease and safety of administering 50% nitrous oxide as an analgesic. The rapid reversibility of its effect would also prevent it from precluding diagnosis.

=== Recreational ===
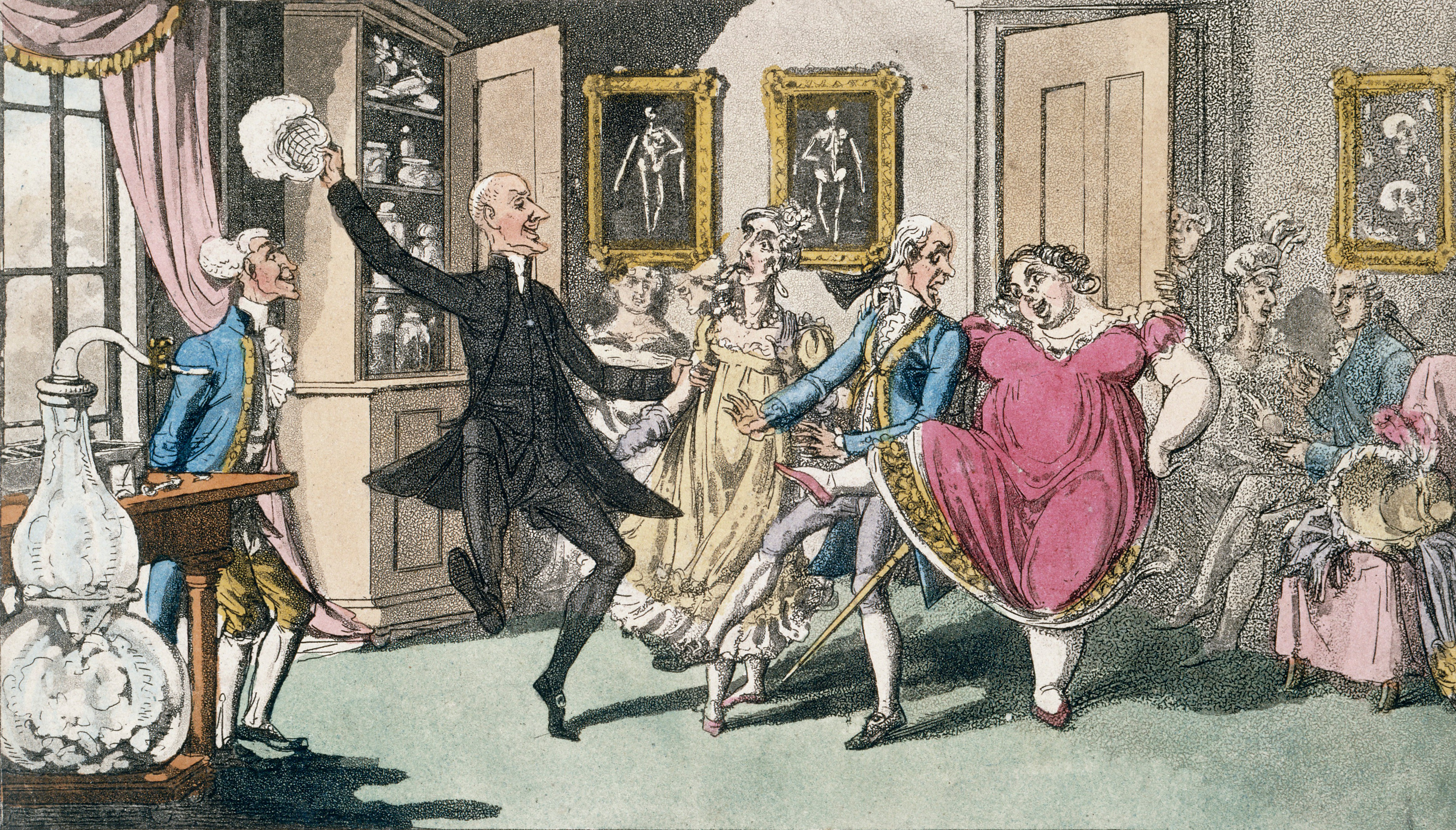
Aquatint depiction of a laughing gas party in the nineteenth century, by Thomas Rowlandson

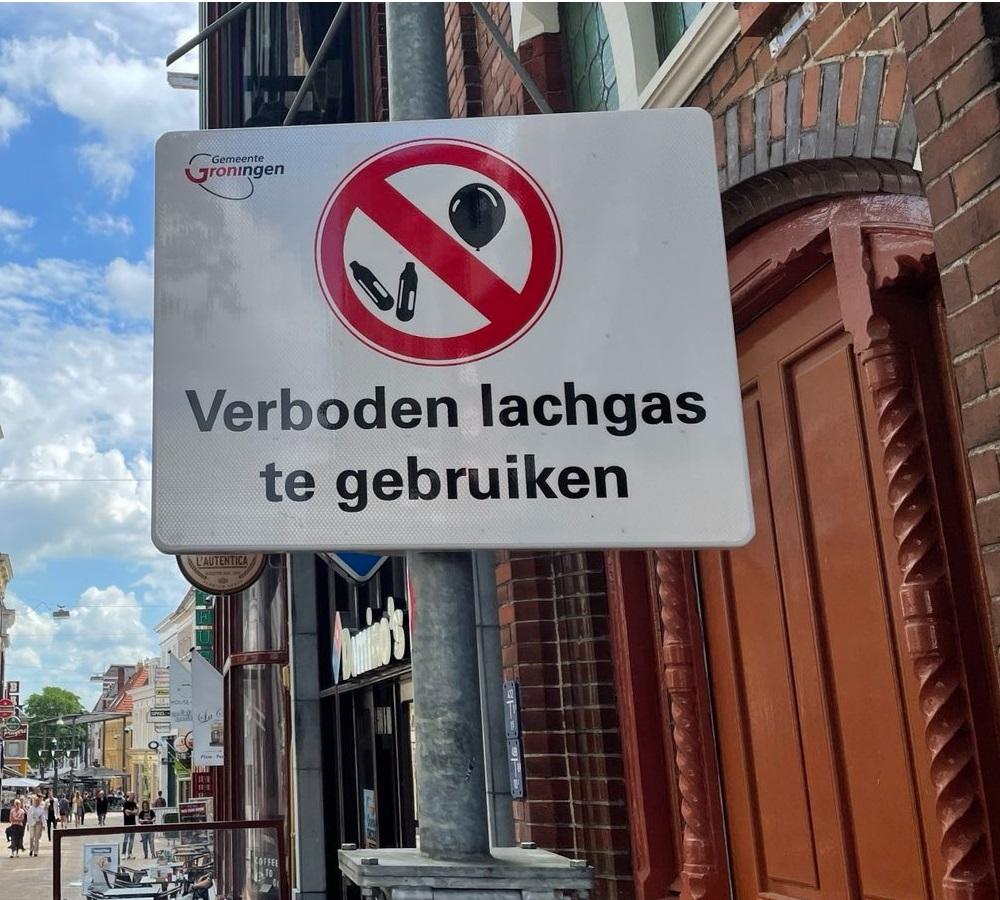
Street sign indicating ban of nitrous oxide use near the Poelestraat in Groningen

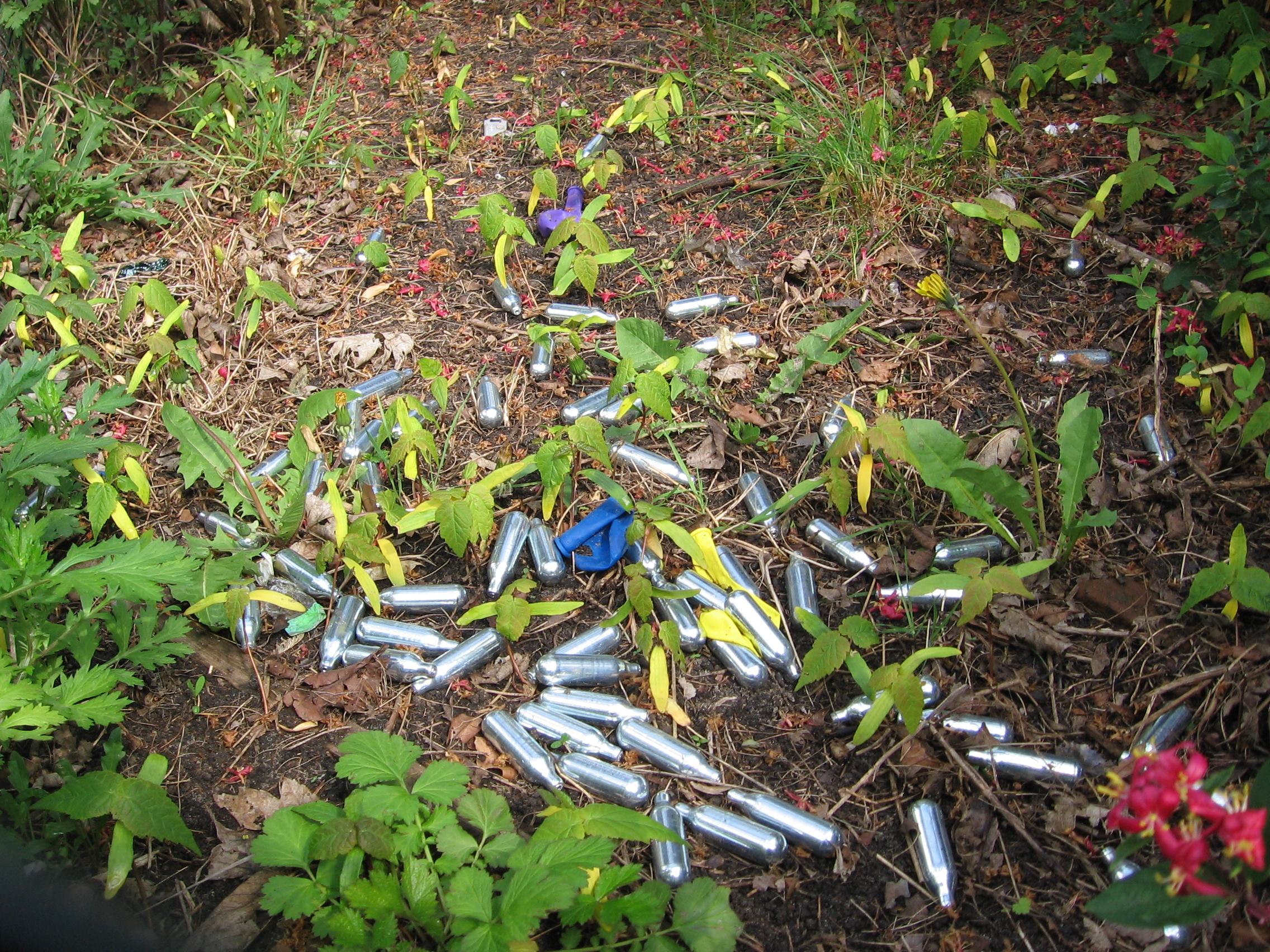
Whippit remnants (the small steel canisters) of recreational drug use, the Netherlands, 2017

Recreational inhalation of nitrous oxide, to induce euphoria and slight hallucinations, began with the British upper class in 1799 in gatherings known as "laughing gas parties".

From the 19th century, the widespread availability of the gas for medical and culinary purposes allowed for recreational use to greatly expand globally. In the UK as of 2014, nitrous oxide was estimated to be used by almost half a million young people at nightspots, festivals and parties.

Widespread recreational use of the drug throughout the UK was featured in the 2017 Vice documentary Inside The Laughing Gas Black Market, in which journalist Matt Shea met with dealers of the drug who stole it from hospitals.

A significant issue cited in London's press is the effect of nitrous oxide canister littering, which is highly visible and causes significant complaints from communities.

Prior to 8 November 2023 in the UK, nitrous oxide was subject to the Psychoactive Substances Act 2016, making it illegal to produce, supply, import or export nitrous oxide for recreational use. The updated law prohibited possession of nitrous oxide where it's possession is likely to course it to be 'wrongfully inhaled' with the burden of proof in demonstrating possession for a legitimate purpose lying with the alleged offender (Defendant presumed guilty until proven innocent), classifying it as a Class C drug under the Misuse of Drugs Act 1971.

While nitrous oxide is understood by most recreational users to give a "safe high", many are unaware that excessive consumption may cause neurological harm which, if left untreated, can cause permanent neurological damage. In Australia, recreational use became a public health concern following a rise in reports of neurotoxicity and emergency room admissions. In the state of South Australia, legislation was passed in 2020 to restrict canister sales.

In 2024, under the street name "Galaxy Gas", nitrous oxide has exploded in popularity among young people for recreational use, partially driven by TikTok trends.

== Safety ==
Nitrous oxide is a significant occupational hazard for surgeons, dentists and nurses. Because the gas is minimally metabolised in humans (with a rate of 0.004%), it retains its potency when exhaled into the room by the patient, and can intoxicate the clinic staff if the room is poorly ventilated, with potential chronic exposure. A continuous-flow fresh-air ventilation system or N_{2}O scavenger system may be needed to prevent waste-gas buildup. The National Institute for Occupational Safety and Health recommends that workers' exposure to nitrous oxide should be controlled during the administration of anaesthetic gas in medical, dental and veterinary operators. It set a recommended exposure limit (REL) of 25 ppm (46 mg/m^{3}) to escaped anaesthetic.

Exposure to nitrous oxide causes short-term impairment of cognition, audiovisual acuity, and manual dexterity, as well as spatial and temporal disorientation, putting the user at risk of accidental injury.

Nitrous oxide is neurotoxic, and medium or long-term habitual consumption of significant quantities can cause neurological harm with the potential for permanent damage if left untreated. It is believed that, like other NMDA receptor antagonists, N_{2}O produces Olney's lesions in rodents upon prolonged (several hour) exposure. However, because it is normally expelled from the body rapidly, it is less likely to be neurotoxic than other NMDAR antagonists. In rodents, short-term exposure results in only mild injury that is rapidly reversible, and neuronal death occurs only after constant and sustained exposure. Nitrous oxide may also cause neurotoxicity after extended exposure because of hypoxia. This is especially true of non-medical formulations such as whipped-cream chargers ("whippits" or "nangs"), which contain no oxygen gas.

In reports to poison control centers, heavy users (≥400 g or ≥200 L of N_{2}O gas in one session) or frequent users (regular, i.e., daily or weekly) have developed signs of peripheral neuropathy: ataxia (gait abnormalities) or paresthesia (perception of sensations such as tingling, numbness, or prickling, mostly in the extremities). Such early signs of neurological damage indicate chronic toxicity.

Nitrous oxide might have therapeutic use in treating stroke. In a rodent model, nitrous oxide at 75% by volume reduced ischemia-induced neuronal death induced by occlusion of the middle cerebral artery, and decreased NMDA-induced Ca^{2+} influx in neuronal cell cultures, a cause of excitotoxicity.

Occupational exposure to ambient nitrous oxide has been associated with DNA damage, due to interruptions in DNA synthesis. This correlation is dose-dependent and does not appear to extend to casual recreational use; however, further research is needed to confirm the level of exposure needed to cause damage.

Inhalation of pure nitrous oxide causes oxygen deprivation, resulting in low blood pressure, fainting, and even heart attacks. This can occur if the user inhales large quantities continuously, as with a strap-on mask connected to a gas canister or other inhalation system, or prolonged breath-holding.

Long-term exposure to nitrous oxide may cause vitamin B_{12} deficiency. This can cause serious neurotoxicity if the user has preexisting vitamin B_{12} deficiency. It inactivates the cobalamin form of vitamin B_{12} by oxidation. Symptoms of vitamin B_{12} deficiency, including sensory neuropathy, myelopathy and encephalopathy, may occur within days or weeks of exposure to nitrous oxide anaesthesia in people with subclinical vitamin B_{12} deficiency. Symptoms are treated with high doses of vitamin B_{12}, but recovery can be slow and incomplete. People with normal vitamin B_{12} levels have stores to make the effects of nitrous oxide insignificant, unless exposure is repeated and prolonged (nitrous oxide abuse). Vitamin B_{12} levels should be checked in people with risk factors for vitamin B_{12} deficiency prior to using nitrous oxide anaesthesia.

Several experimental studies in rats indicate that chronic exposure of pregnant females to nitrous oxide may have adverse effects on the developing fetus.

At room temperature (20 °C [68 °F]) the saturated vapour pressure is 50.525 bar, rising up to 72.45 bar at 36.4 °C (97.5 °F)—the critical temperature. The pressure curve is thus unusually sensitive to temperature. As with many strong oxidisers, contamination of parts with fuels have been implicated in rocketry accidents, where small quantities of nitrous/fuel mixtures explode due to "water hammer"-like effects (sometimes called "dieseling"—heating due to adiabatic compression of gases can reach decomposition temperatures). Some common building materials such as stainless steel and aluminium can act as fuels with strong oxidisers such as nitrous oxide, as can contaminants that may ignite due to adiabatic compression. There also have been incidents where nitrous oxide decomposition in plumbing has led to the explosion of large tanks.

== Environmental impact ==
Global accounting of N_{2}O sources and sinks over the decade ending 2016 indicates that about 40% of the average 17 Tg N/yr (teragrams, or million metric tons, of nitrogen per year) of emissions originated from human activity, and shows that emissions growth chiefly came from expanding agriculture.

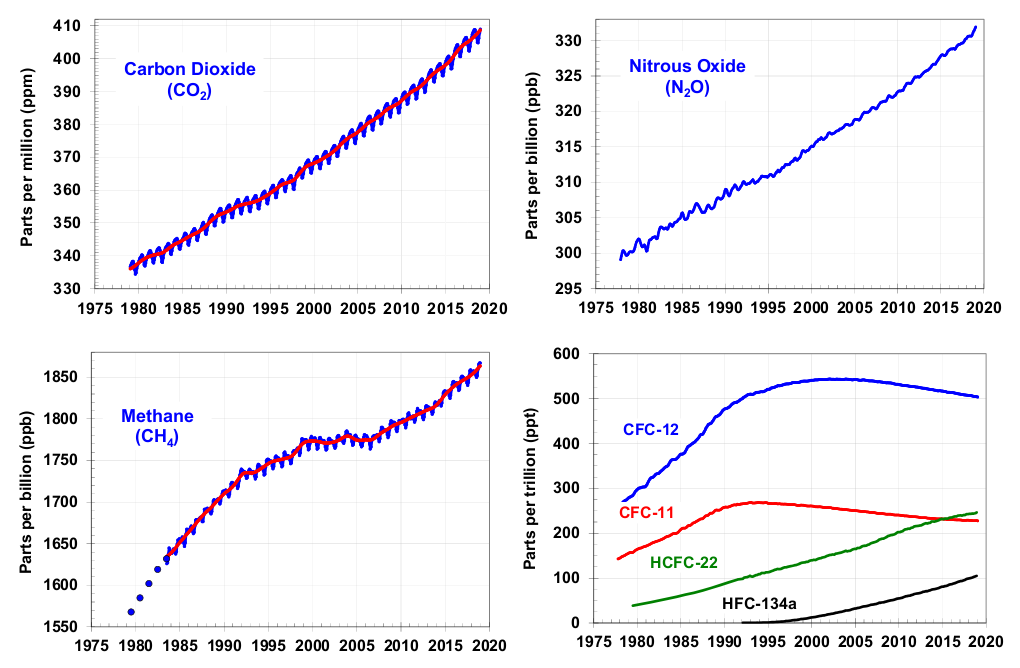
Trends in the atmospheric abundance of long-lived greenhouse gases

Nitrous oxide has significant global warming potential as a greenhouse gas. On a per-molecule basis, considered over a 100-year period, nitrous oxide has 265 times the atmospheric heat-trapping ability of carbon dioxide (CO_{2}). However, because of its low concentration (less than one thousandth of that of CO_{2}), its contribution to the greenhouse effect is less than one third that of carbon dioxide, and also less than methane. On the other hand, since about 40% of the N_{2}O entering the atmosphere is the result of human activity, control of nitrous oxide is part of efforts to curb greenhouse gas emissions.

Most human caused nitrous oxide released into the atmosphere is a greenhouse gas emission from agriculture, when farmers add nitrogen-based fertilizers onto the fields, and through the breakdown of animal manure. Reduction of emissions can be a hot topic in the politics of climate change.

Nitrous oxide is also released as a by-product of burning fossil fuel, though the amount released depends on which fuel was used. It is also emitted through the manufacture of nitric acid, which is used in the synthesis of nitrogen fertilizers. The production of adipic acid, a precursor to nylon and other synthetic clothing fibres, also releases nitrous oxide.

A rise in atmospheric nitrous oxide concentrations has been implicated as a possible contributor to the extremely intense global warming during the Cenomanian-Turonian boundary event.

Nitrous oxide has also been implicated in thinning the ozone layer. A 2009 study suggested that N_{2}O emission was the single most important ozone-depleting emission and it was expected to remain the largest throughout the 21st century.

== Legality ==
In India transfer of nitrous oxide from bulk cylinders to smaller, more transportable E-type, 1,590-litre-capacity tanks is legal when intended for medical anaesthesia.

The New Zealand Ministry of Health has warned that nitrous oxide is a prescription medicine whose sale or possession without a prescription is an offense under the Medicines Act. This would seemingly prohibit all non-medicinal uses of nitrous oxide, although it is implied that only recreational use will be targeted.

In August 2015, the Council of the London Borough of Lambeth (UK) banned the use of the drug for recreational purposes, making offenders liable to an on-the-spot fine of up to £1,000. In September 2023, the UK Government announced that nitrous oxide would be made illegal by the end of the year as a class C drug, with possession potentially carrying up to a two-year prison sentence or an unlimited fine.

Possession of nitrous oxide is legal under United States federal law and is not subject to DEA purview. It is, however, regulated by the Food and Drug Administration under the Food Drug and Cosmetics Act; prosecution is possible under its "misbranding" clauses, prohibiting the sale or distribution of nitrous oxide for the purpose of human consumption without a proper medical license. Many states have laws regulating the possession, sale and distribution of nitrous oxide. Such laws usually ban distribution to minors or limit the amount that may be sold without special license. For example, in California, possession for recreational use is prohibited and qualifies as a misdemeanor.

== See also ==
- DayCent
- Fink effect
- Nitrous oxide fuel blend
