= Whipped-cream charger =

Steel cylinder filled with nitrous oxide

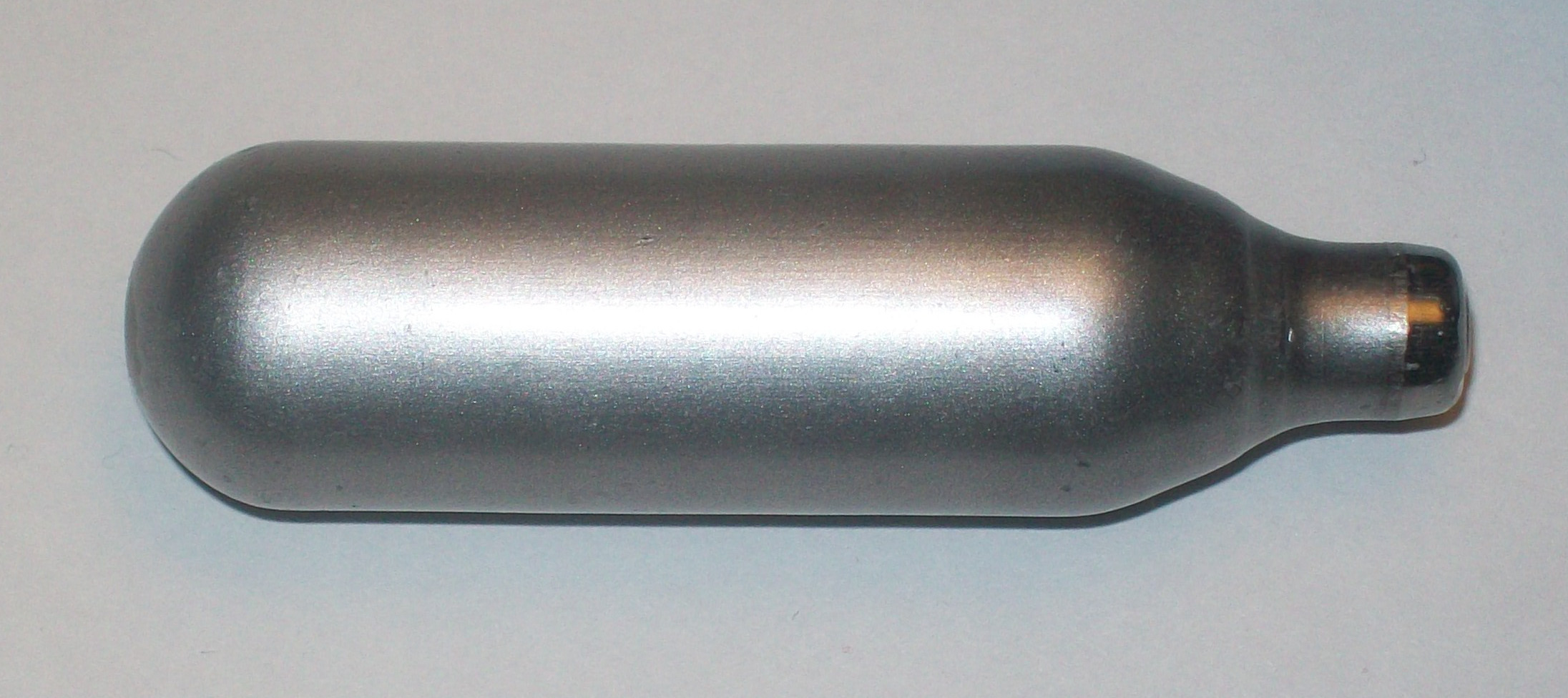
A single charger

A whipped cream charger (colloquially called a whippet, nos or nang when used recreationally) is a steel cylinder or cartridge filled with nitrous oxide (N_{2}O) that is used as a whipping agent in whipped cream. The narrow end of a charger has a foil covering that is broken to release the gas. This is usually done by a sharp pin inside the whipping siphon.

Nitrous oxide is a popular recreational drug, and whipped cream chargers are a convenient source of the gas.

== Description ==
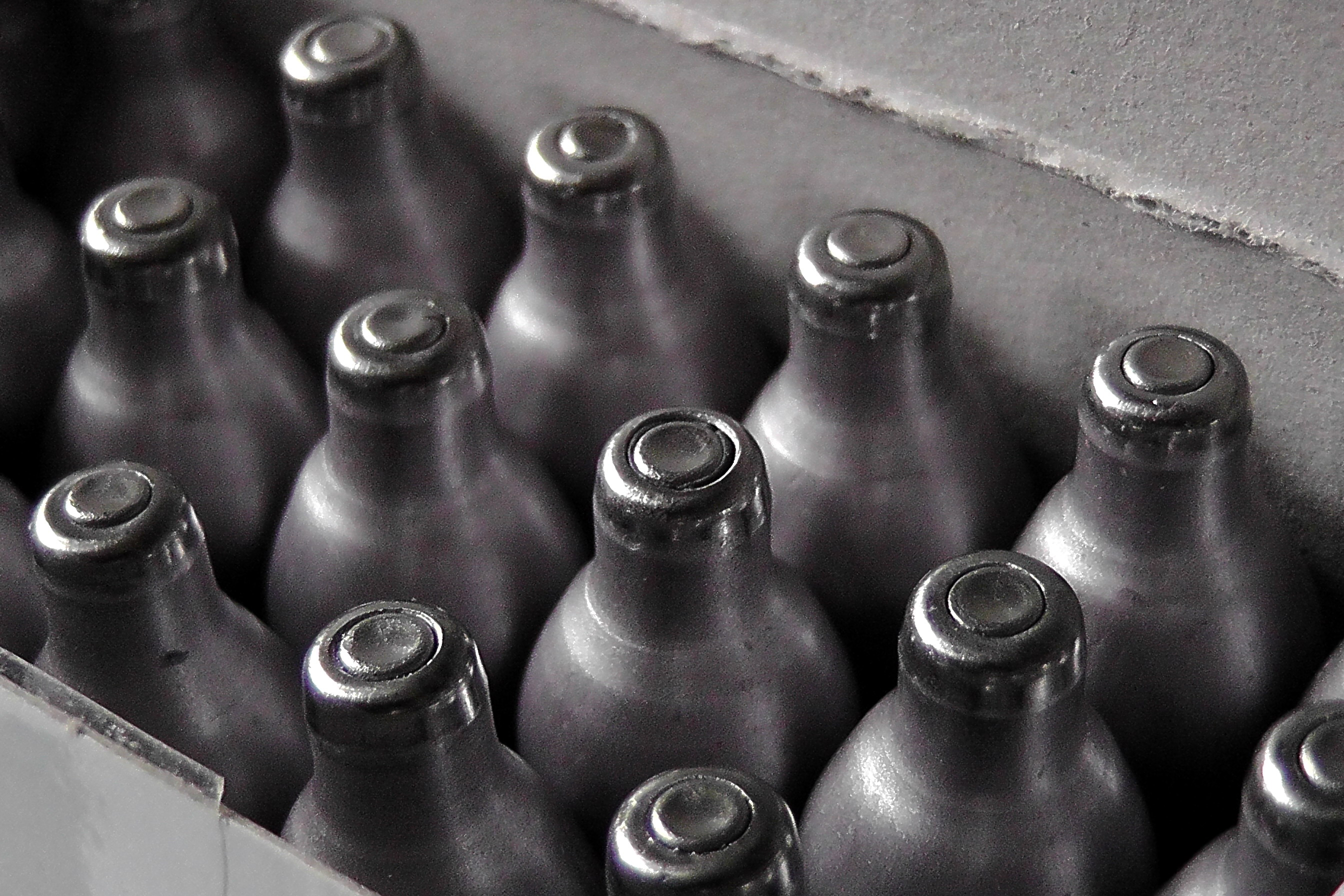
A box of chargers, showing their foil sealed ends that release the gas after being punctured

The cylinders are about 6.3 centimetres (2 1/2 in) long by 1.8 cm (3/4 in) wide, with a volume of 10 cubic centimetres (0.6 cu in) and capacity for most brands of 8 grams (1/4 oz) of pressurized N_{2}O. Their walls are about 2 millimetres (1/16 in) thick to withstand the pressure of the gas, and they are rounded at one end with a narrow tip at the other end. While refillable chargers were once available, all chargers are now non-refillable; the latter consist entirely of recyclable steel.

== Production ==
In Europe, where the production and use of whip cream chargers originated, there are presently three factories involved in its production. Their standard capacity is 7.8 grams of nitrous oxide.

== Application ==
Whipped cream chargers are intended for low-volume or occasional use, such as home kitchens, restaurants, and coffee shop applications.

For very high volume commercial use, there are regulated tank systems for filling much larger containers and dispensing more whipped cream. These are desirable if the volume is more than a production level of ten litres per hour.

== Uses ==
=== Culinary ===
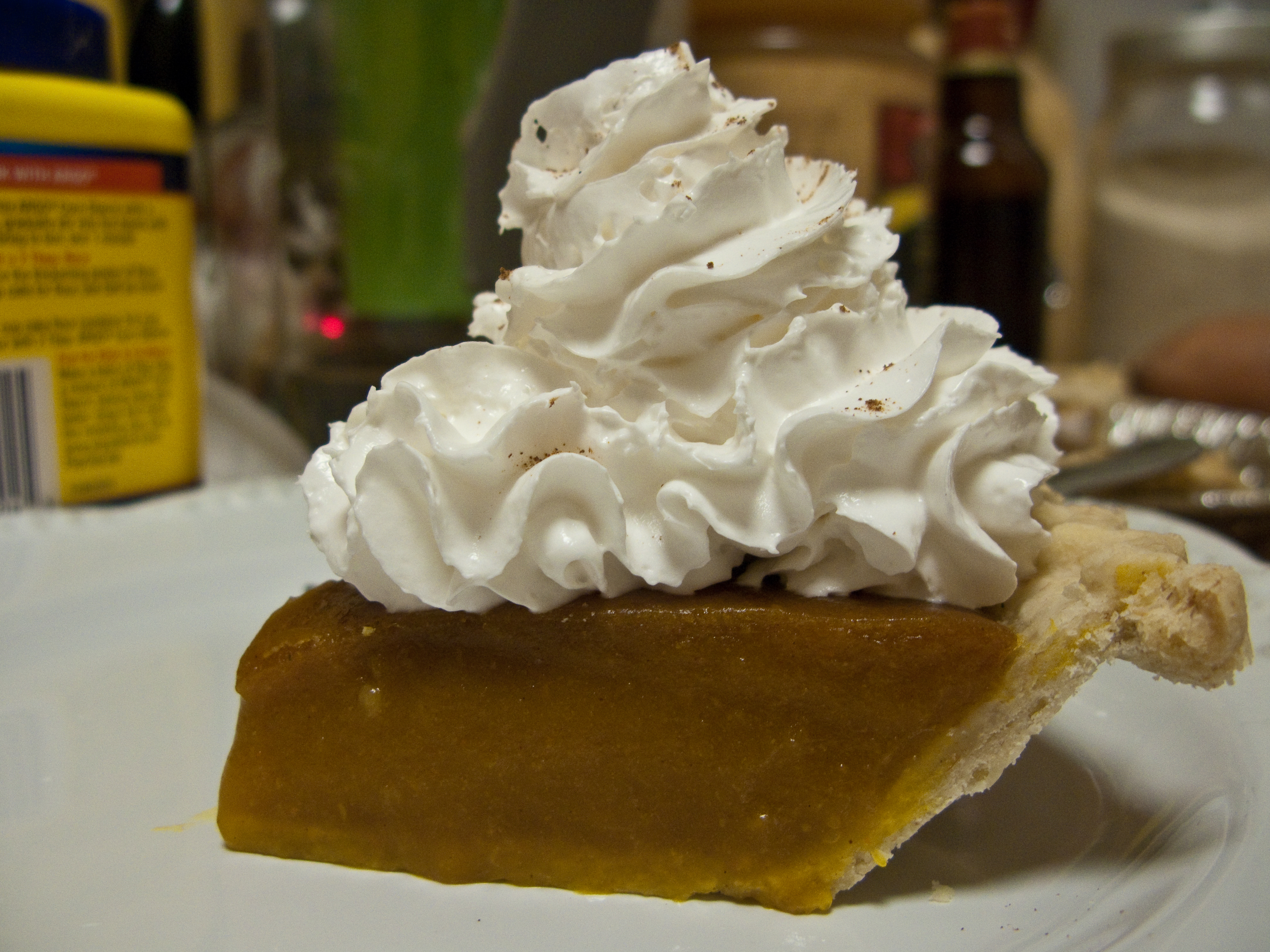
Whipped cream from a nitrous oxide dispenser, on a slice of pumpkin pie

Nitrous oxide is used because it dissolves easily into the cream, and does not cause the cream to oxidize while it is in the can. The cream must have a minimum fat content of 28% to produce whipped cream with a dispenser. The recipe for the cream to be whipped typically calls for heavy cream and sugar, along with any desired flavorings or colorings. In a sealed container, this cream is pressurized with nitrous oxide, which dissolves into the cream as per its lipophilicity.

When the cream dispenser's valve is opened, the cream solution is expelled by the high pressure inside. The change in pressure causes some of the dissolved gas to return to bubbles, effectively fluffing up the cream. Nitrous oxide is bacteriostatic (it inhibits bacteria growth), so a charged cream dispenser can be kept in the refrigerator for up to two weeks.

=== Recreational drug ===
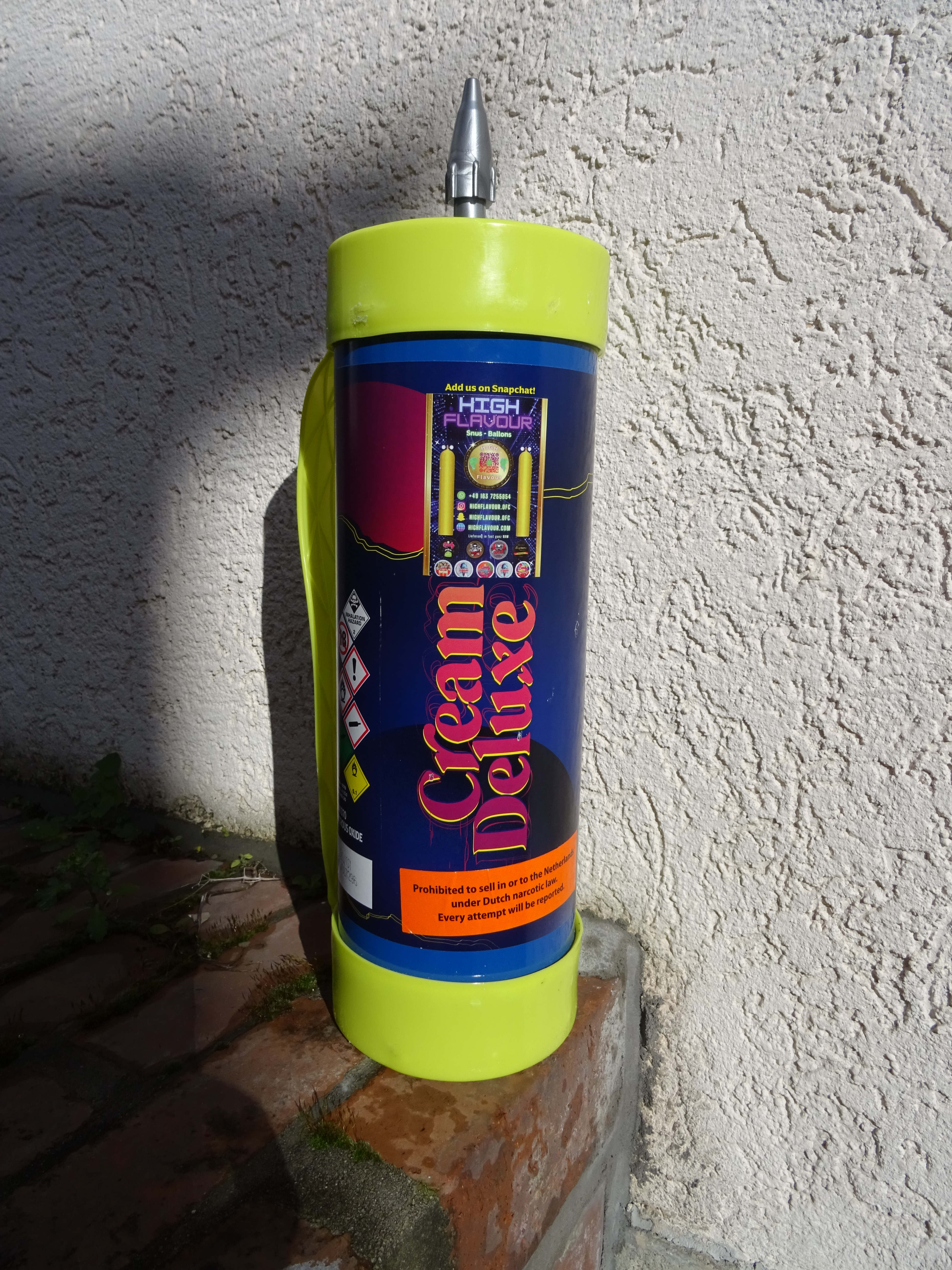
3 liter can of "High Flavour" nitrous oxide with a label warning that its sale is prohibited in the Netherlands

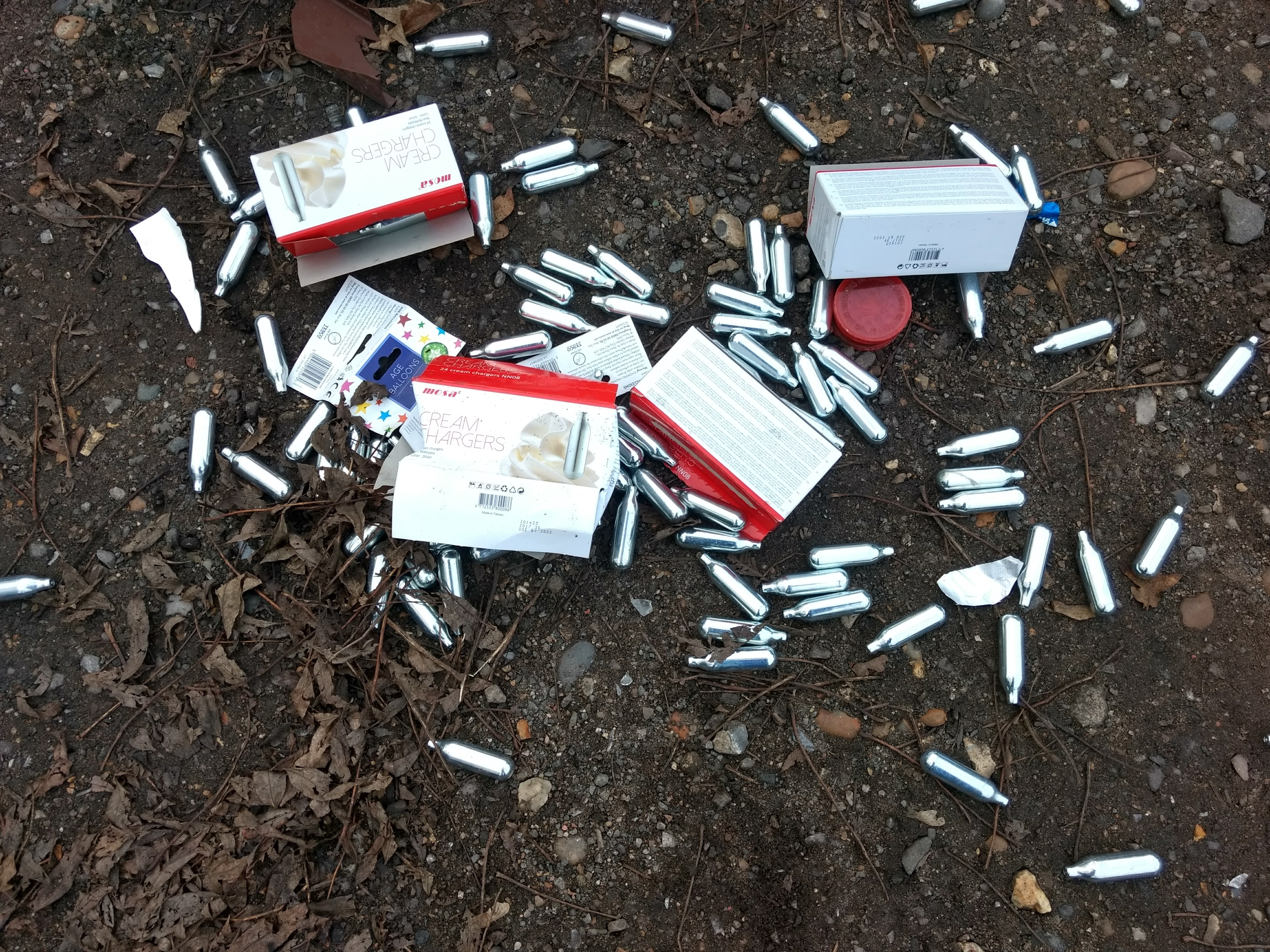
Spent whipped cream chargers used for nitrous oxide inhalation dumped at a car park in London

Because of their availability, chargers are usually the method of choice for users seeking to use nitrous oxide recreationally. Tanks of medical-grade nitrous oxide are difficult to obtain, and vehicle-grade nitrous oxide contains substances such as sulfur dioxide to prevent human consumption. Chargers are cheaply available in many stores and online. Puncturing the charger to release its gas is one feature of a whipped-cream dispenser, but cheaper compact "crackers" are sold to recreational users for this specific purpose.

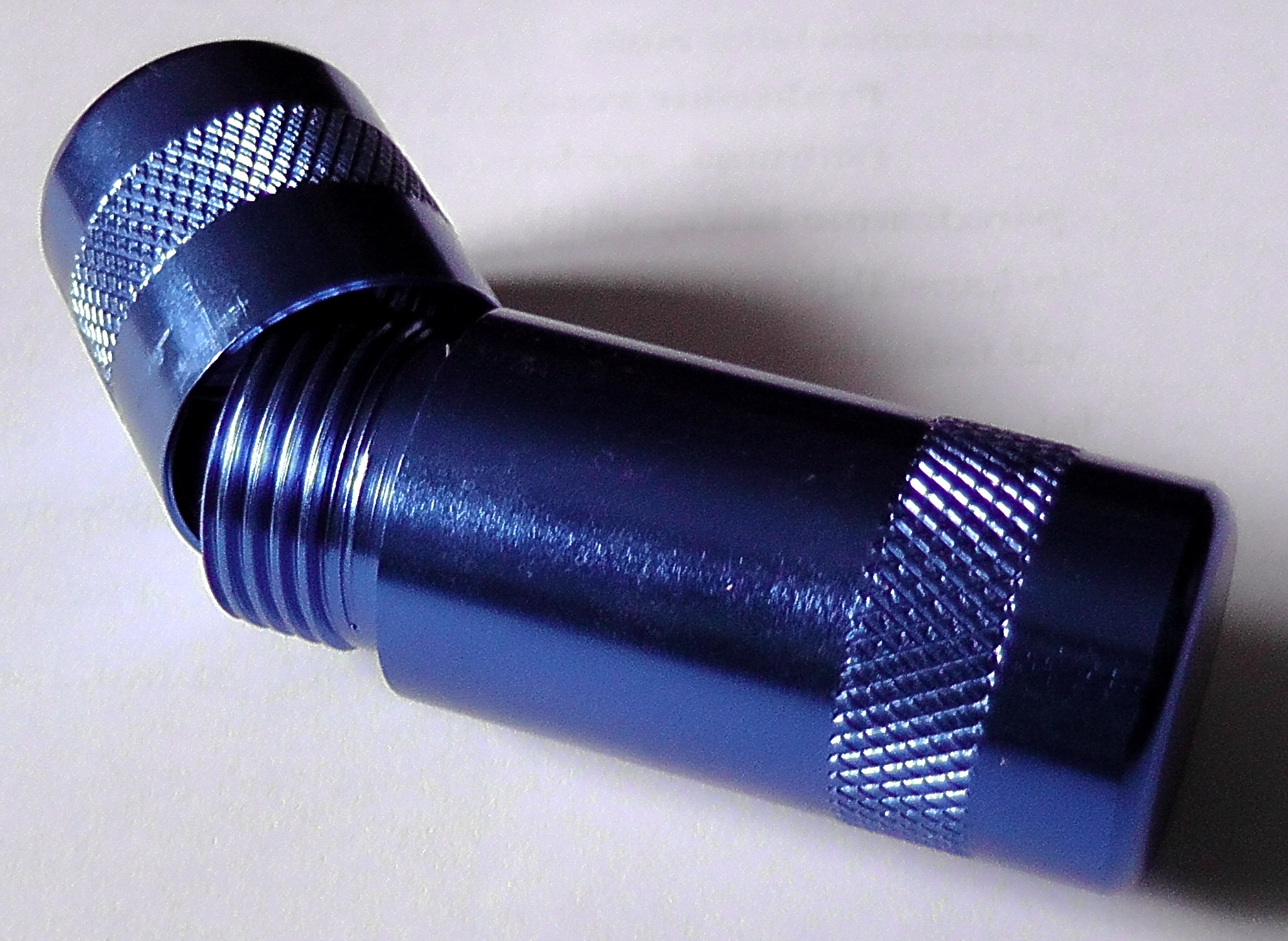
A whipped-cream charger cracker

To inhale from a charger, users either fill a balloon using a cracker, fill an empty whipped cream dispenser and inhale from it, or likewise use a dispenser to fill a balloon as the potentially rapid rush of gas from the spout of the dispenser may be too harsh. Inhaling directly from a cracker is particularly dangerous due to the risk of developing frostbite on the inside of the mouth or esophagus. The 8 gram nitrous oxide steel cylinder charger when discharged into an empty whipped cream dispenser creates a pressure of 30 pounds per square inch (200kPa) and delivers 3.24 litres of nitrous oxide gas.

=== Model rocketry ===
Whipped cream chargers are also used by model rocket enthusiasts for micro hybrid engines, where it acts as an oxidizer for solid fuels such as polyethylene, HTPB, or paraffin wax. N_{2}O may be used to light most solid propellants and keep the combustion going. Due to the maximum volume of whipped cream chargers they are only used in small scale engines and not anything larger than about 29 mm in diameter.

== See also ==
- Galaxy Gas
- Powerlet
