= Relative analgesia machine =

Dental sedation device

A relative analgesia machine is used by dentists to induce inhalation sedation in their patients. It delivers a mixture of nitrous oxide ("laughing gas") and oxygen. A relative analgesia machine is simpler than an anaesthetic machine, as it does not feature the additional medical ventilator and anaesthetic vaporiser, which are only needed for administration of general anesthetics. Instead the relative analgesia machine is designed for the light form of anaesthesia with nitrous oxide, where the patient is less sensitive to pain but remains fully conscious.
