= Galaxy Gas =

American nitrous oxide brand

- Industry: Culinary
- Founded: 2021
- Defunct: 2025
- Headquarters: Atlanta, Georgia, United States
- Products: Whipped-cream chargers

Galaxy Gas is an American company that produces flavored whipped-cream chargers and dispensers containing nitrous oxide. Founded in 2021, Galaxy Gas is based in Atlanta, Georgia. Despite identifying themselves as a culinary brand and their dispensers being advertised for culinary use such as whipping ingredients, Galaxy Gas gained notoriety through social media in 2024 due to their products being used as a recreational nitrous oxide inhalant, with the inhalation of their canisters gaining popularity as a TikTok trend; the platform has since blocked "Galaxy Gas" as a search result. The brand's name has become genericized in reference to nitrous oxide inhalants.

Galaxy Gas, LLC was founded in 2021 by Khalil Amor, who ran Cloud 9, an American chain of smoke shops.

Galaxy Gas canisters have been sold through major retailers including Walmart and Amazon, allowing for the product to be easily accessible to consumers regardless of their age. A delay in federal regulation of Galaxy Gas canisters has contributed to what many critics label an epidemic. The company has responded to the misuse of their dispensers through releasing statements warning consumers of the health risks resulted from misusing their product, additionally claiming that their products are solely intended for culinary use. In September 2024, Galaxy Gas paused sales of their whipped-cream chargers.

== Health concerns ==
Galaxy Gas has been criticized for its packaging design as well as its incorporation of flavors in the gas canisters, concerns being raised that these aspects are enticing to and marketed towards children. A Galaxy Gas spokesperson responded that the appearance, incorporation of flavor, and sales at smoke shops and adult stores is due to marketing towards an adult demographic who use it to create an “erotic culinary lubricant".

Galaxy Gas, among other brands, sells canisters containing a mass of nitrous oxide well above 500 grams, which is much higher than the more typical chargers containing 8 grams. The relatively large size and sale outside of culinary suppliers has led to professionals involved with assisting individuals who have abused nitrous oxide being skeptical of the stated culinary intent of the products.
