= DayCent =

DayCent is a biogeochemical model of agroecosystems, simulating fluxes of carbon and nitrogen between the atmosphere, vegetation, and soil. It is a daily time series version of the CENTURY biogeochemical model.

The United States Environmental Protection Agency, United States Department of Agriculture/ARS and the Colorado State University Natural Resource Ecology Lab are currently using the DayCent model to develop a national inventory of N_{2}O emissions from U.S. agricultural soils. This inventory will be compared and contrasted with the existing Intergovernmental Panel on Climate Change (IPCC) agricultural N_{2}O emissions inventory for the United States. Having more accurate data to account for nutrient cycling could have significant implications for public policy associated with the United Nations Framework Convention on Climate Change (UNFCCC) and potential future mitigation efforts in the United States.

Model inputs include daily minimum and maximum air temperature and precipitation, surface soil texture class, and land cover/use data. Model outputs include daily fluxes of various N-gas species (e.g., N_{2}O, NO_{x}, N_{2}); daily CO_{2} flux from heterotrophic soil respiration; soil organic C and N; net primary productivity; daily water and nitrate (NO_{3}) leaching, and other ecosystem parameters. DayCent has been tested using data from various native and managed systems. In similar studies, comparisons between DayCent simulated data and measured values for annual crop yields, N_{2}O emissions, and NO_{3} leaching produced r^{2} values of 0.72, 0.68, and 0.61 respectively.
