= Recreational use of nitrous oxide =

Inhalation of nitrous oxide for psychoactive effects

Nitrous oxide (recreational use)
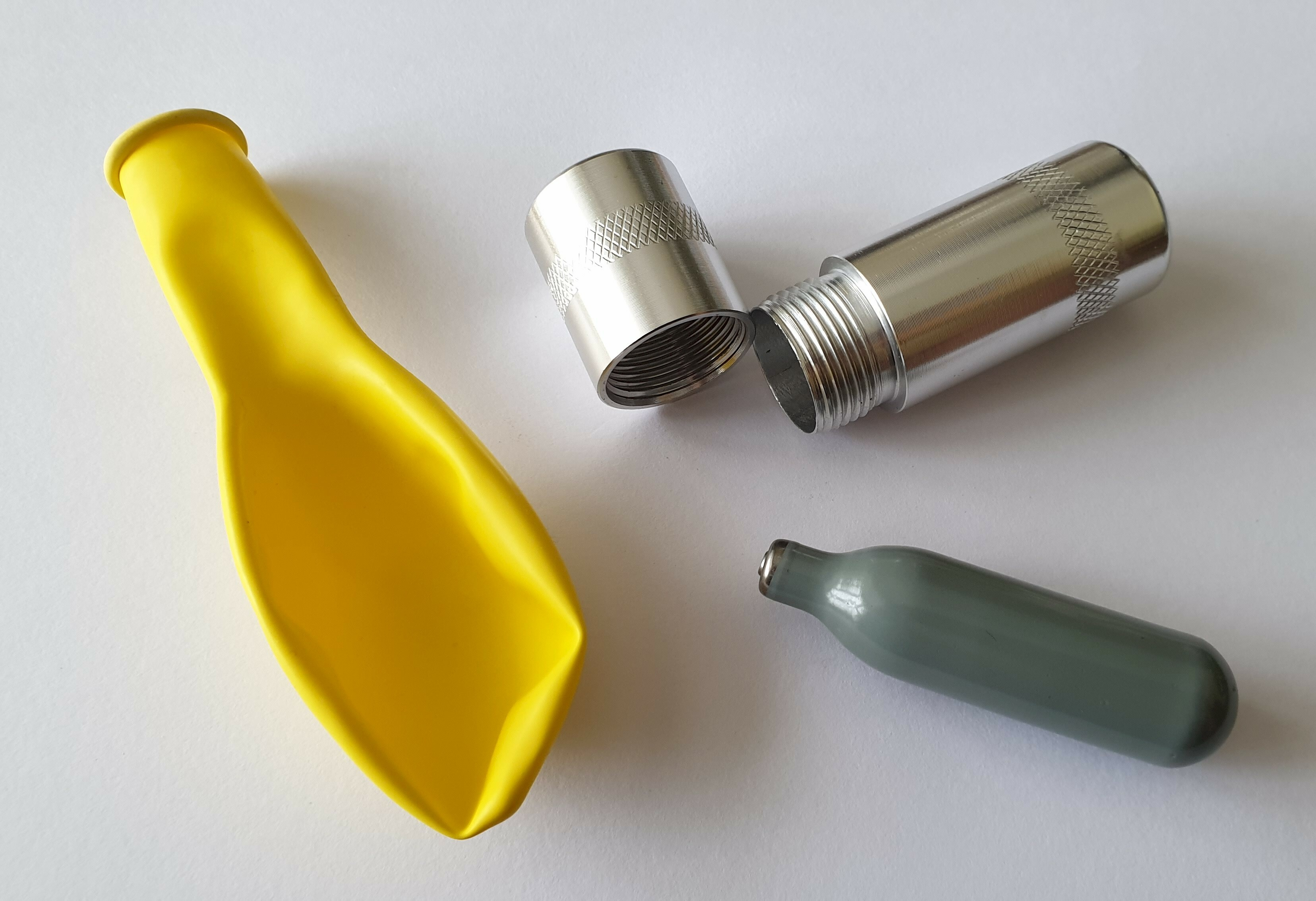
- Food grade N2O charger (bottom right), cracker (top right) and balloon

Clinical data
- Other names: Laughing gas; Slang: Nos, nangs, hippy crack, whippets, whippits, cannies, nitrous, dusters, galaxy gas
- Routes of administration: Inhalation
- Drug class: NMDA receptor antagonist; dissociative hallucinogen; analgesic; general anesthetic

Legal status
- Legal status: AU: OTC (Schedule 6); CA: OTC (C.01.036.1); NZ: OTC (R18); UK: C (since 2023); US: OTC (regulated by FDA)

Pharmacokinetic data
- Metabolism: Not metabolized
- Metabolites: None
- Excretion: Exhaled

Identifiers
- CAS Number: 10024-97-2
- UNII: K50XQU1029

Chemical and physical data
- Formula: N_{2}O
- 3D model (JSmol): Interactive image
- SMILES: [N-]=[N+]=O

Nitrous oxide (N_{2}O), commonly referred to as laughing gas, along with various street names, is an inert gas which can induce euphoria, dissociation, hallucinogenic states of mind, and relaxation when inhaled. Nitrous oxide has no acute biochemical or cellular toxicity and is not metabolized in humans or other mammals. Rare deaths and injuries associated with use are due to asphyxia or accidents related to alcohol, or vitamin B_{12} deficiency. Excessive use can lead to long-term and significant neurological and haematological toxicity, such as subacute combined degeneration of spinal cord.

First recorded in the 18th century at upper-class "laughing gas parties", the experience was largely limited to medical students until the late 20th century when laws limiting access to the gas were loosened to supply dentists and hospitals. By the 2010s, nitrous oxide had become more popular as a recreational drug in the Western world and other nations.

Increasing recreational use has become a public health concern internationally due to the potential for long-term neurological damage caused by habitual use. Recreational users are often unaware of the risks. Owing to the chemical's numerous legitimate uses, the sale and possession of nitrous oxide is legal in many countries, although some have criminalised supplying it for recreational purposes.

== Effects ==
When used recreationally, nitrous oxide can induce euphoria, relaxation and a hallucinogenic state. Long-term or habitual use can lead to severe neurological damage.

Nitrous oxide is said to enhance the effects of psychedelics.

Since nitrous oxide can cause dizziness, dissociation, and temporary loss of motor control, it is unsafe to inhale while standing up. Safer use can involve inhalation while seated to decrease risks of injury by falling. Inhalation directly from a tank poses serious health risks, as it can cause frostbite since the gas is dangerously low-temperature when released. For those reasons, most recreational users will discharge the gas into a balloon or whipped cream dispenser before inhaling.

=== Adverse effects ===
Death can result if it is inhaled in such a way that not enough oxygen is breathed in. While the pure gas is not acutely toxic, it inactivates vitamin B_{12}, with continued use causing neurological damage due to peripheral and central demyelination. Symptoms are similar to B_{12} deficiency: anemia due to reduced hemopoiesis, neuropathy, tinnitus, and numbness in extremities. Subacute combined degeneration of spinal cord can ensue.

A two-week course of vitamin B_{12} injection (not oral supplementation) is recommended as a first-line treatment, combined with abstinence; oral supplementation may be phased-in later. Recovery is often protracted and incomplete.

Inhaling industrial-grade nitrous oxide is dangerous, as it contains many impurities and is not intended for use on humans. "Food grade" nitrous oxide is also not meant to be inhaled, as the bulbs commonly have industrial lubricants from their manufacturing process on and in them. When the bulb is punctured, these solvents can aerosolize, introducing unknown particles into the gas. These lubricants commonly leave an oily residue on the bulb "cracker" or inside the whipped cream dispenser.

In England 783 people were admitted to hospitals between April 2025 and March 2026 with a diagnosis of nitrous oxide use.

It is not known if nitrous oxide causes drug dependency but its use can be habit-forming.

==== Disabilities ====
In 2022, an addicted couple in Portland, Oregon became temporarily unable to walk due to spinal nerve damage due to vitamin B12 inactivation caused by chronic recreational use of nitrous oxide and still had difficulties walking a year later.

==== Nitrous-oxide-related deaths ====
From 1993 to 2016, 30 death certificates in England and Wales mentioned nitrous oxide. Of those, 6 were in the 17 years from 1993 through 2009, and 24 were in the 7 years from 2010 through 2016. Furthermore, the Office for National Statistics reported 56 deaths from the substance within the same region between the years of 2001 and 2020.

In 2018 an Ohio University freshman died of asphyxiation as a result of nitrous oxide inhalation from whipped-cream chargers, allegedly as part of a hazing ritual.

In 2020 a fifteen-year-old Irish boy died after inhaling nitrous oxide, leading to Ireland's Health Service Executive classing it as a dangerous drug.

== Society and culture ==
=== Discovery and early use ===
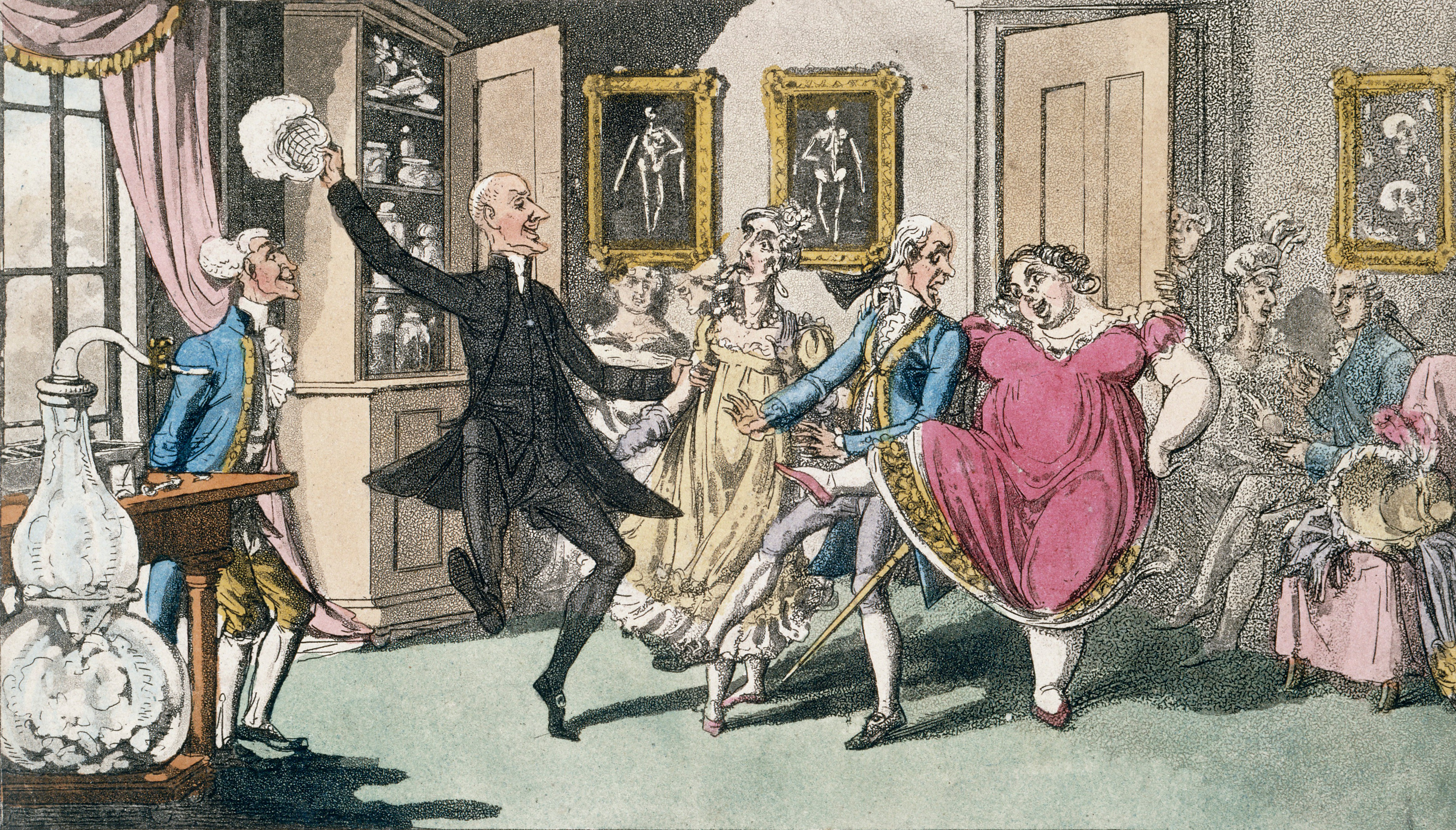
Aquatint depiction of a laughing gas party in the 19th century

Inhalation of nitrous oxide for recreational use, with the purpose of causing euphoria or slight hallucinations, began as a phenomenon for the British upper class in 1799, known as "laughing gas parties". English chemist Humphry Davy offered the gas to party guests in a silken bag, and documented its effects in his 1800 book Researches, Chemical and Philosophical which investigated "nitrous oxide, or diphlogisticated nitrous air, and its respiration". Poet Samuel Taylor Coleridge described the effect as "like returning from a walk in the snow into a warm room".

During the 19th century, William James and many contemporaries found that inhalation of nitrous oxide resulted in a powerful spiritual and mystical experience for the user. James claimed to experience the fusing of dichotomies into unity and a revelation of ultimate truth during the inhalation of nitrous oxide. The memory of this experience, however, quickly faded and any attempt to communicate was difficult at best. James described a man who, when under the influence of the gas, claimed to know the secret of the universe.

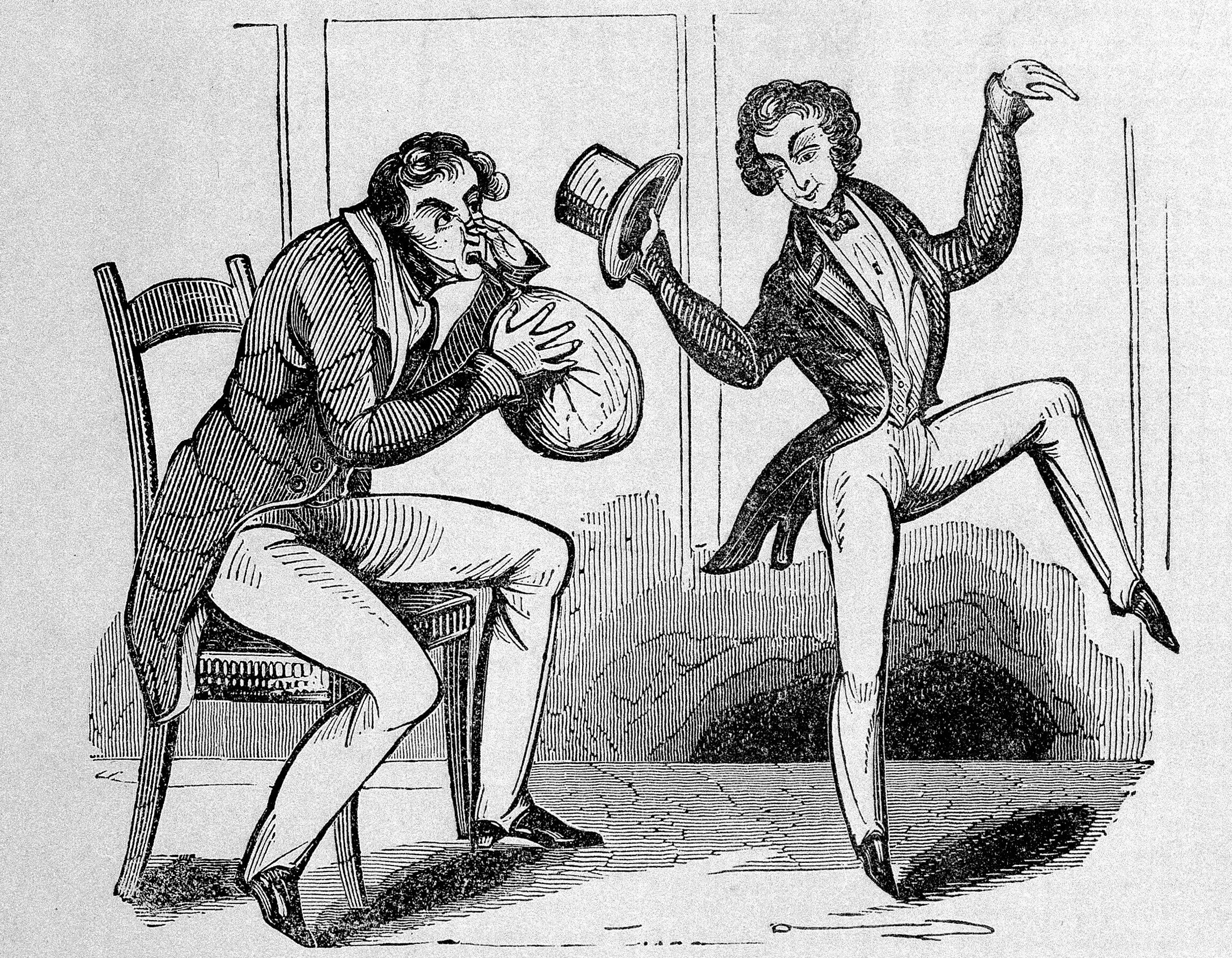
1840 illustration of a man inhaling nitrous oxide, and another experiencing its effects

Until at least 1863, low availability of equipment to produce the gas, combined with low usage of the gas for medical purposes, meant it was a relatively rare phenomenon that mainly happened among students at medical universities. When equipment became more widely available for dentistry and hospitals, most countries also restricted the legal access to buy pure nitrous oxide gas cylinders to those sectors. Even so, its use in parties continued, with gas provided by medical professionals or restaurant workers.

=== 20th century ===
A report from Consumers Union report from 1972 (based upon reports of its use in Maryland 1971, Vancouver 1972, and a survey made by Edward J. Lynn of its non-medical use in Michigan 1970) found that use of the gas for recreational purposes was then prevalent in the US and Canada.

It was not uncommon [in the interviews] to hear from individuals who had been to parties where a professional (doctor, nurse, scientist, inhalation therapist, researcher) had provided nitrous oxide. There also were those who work in restaurants who used the N_{2}O stored in tanks for the preparation of whip cream. Reports were received from people who used the gas contained in aerosol cans both of food and non-food products. At a recent rock festival, nitrous oxide was widely sold for 25 cents a balloon. Contact was made with a "mystical-religious" group that used the gas to accelerate arriving at their transcendental-meditative state of choice. Although a few, more sophisticated users employed nitrous oxide-oxygen mixes with elaborate equipment, most users used balloons or plastic bags. They either held a breath of N_{2}O or rebreathed the gas. There were no adverse effects reported in the more than one hundred individuals surveyed.

=== 21st century ===
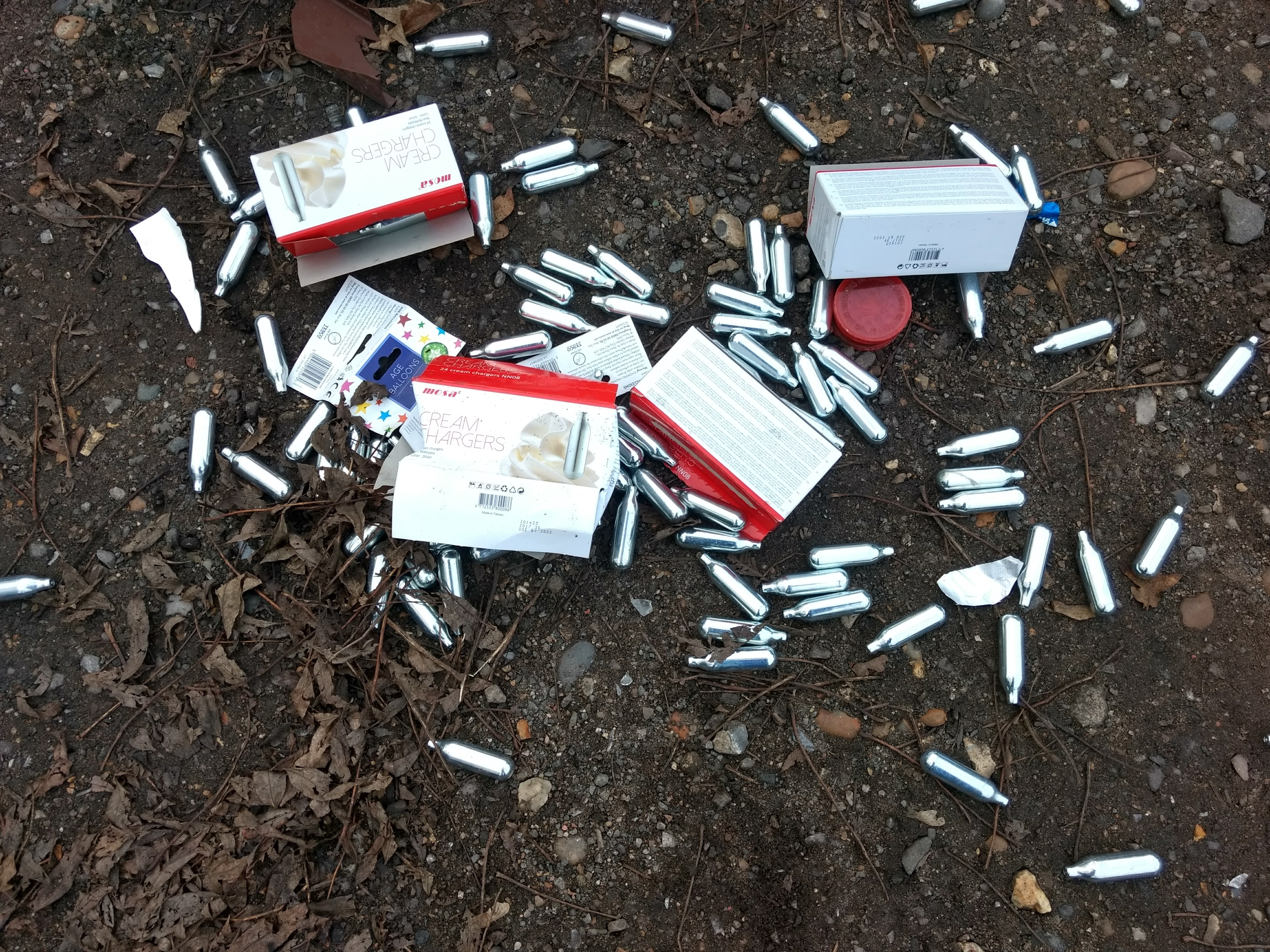
Discarded whipped cream chargers in a London car park, 2017

As of 2022, the gas enjoys moderate popularity in some countries as a recreational drug. 2025 saw the FDA publish an Alert recommending against recreational use of the gas. Nitrous oxide has the street names hippy crack and whippets (or whippits). In Australia and New Zealand, nitrous oxide bulbs are known as nangs, possibly derived from the sound distortion perceived by consumers.

In Thailand, the use of laughing gas balloons containing N_{2}O gas first emerged around 2013, starting with low-priced offerings along Bangkok's Khao San Road.

In Vietnam, the use of laughing gas as a recreational substance began in the 2000s due to its affordability. The balloons used for inhaling the gas are called funky balls and are widely available in bars, pubs, and online for home delivery. This trend is most noticeable in urban areas and social gatherings frequented by young adults.

In China, recreational nitrous oxide use is on the rise and has become a social issue.

In the United Kingdom, as of 2014, nitrous oxide is estimated to be used by almost half a million young people at nightspots, festivals and parties. Officials in Norfolk, Hertfordshire and Thames Valley had reported increasing numbers of discarded whipped-cream chargers being found. Nitrous oxide is a long-lived and potent greenhouse gas and recreational use causes significant emissions.

Recreational users generally use 8 gram (¼ oz) containers of nitrous oxide "whippets", which they use to fill balloons or whipped cream dispensers. The gas is then inhaled from the balloon or dispenser. This is necessary because nitrous oxide is very cold when it undergoes adiabatic decompression on exit from a canister; inhalation directly from a tank is dangerous and can cause frostbite of the larynx and bronchi. Recently, as of 2022 and later, large canisters of nitrous oxide containing 600 grams or more of net content have appeared in vape shops and other retailers. Health professionals have expressed concern as the large size may make it easier for neurotoxic effects and dependency to develop in users. Additionally, in 2024, flavored nitrous oxide canisters produced by Galaxy Gas and other brands have become popular, and also criticized for seemingly being marketed towards children.

== Legal status ==
=== Australia ===
Supply of nitrous oxide for recreational purposes is illegal; however, it is permissible to supply it for cooking and baking purposes. As a deleterious substance, the supply of the substance for the purposes of inhalation can result in two years imprisonment.

The canisters are commonly referred to in Australia as nangs.

=== Germany ===
In Germany, a national ban on the sale of nitrous oxide to minors was introduced in November 2025.

As of 2024, in Germany, using nitrous oxide for recreation was legal and subject to virtually no regulations regarding sale and possession; however, Germany's Federal Minister of Health, Karl Lauterbach, was planning to make the sale of nitrous oxide to minors illegal.

As of April 2025, bans on the sale of nitrous oxide to minors existed in some German federal states, municipalities and districts, and a majority of the German population was in favor of extending the ban to a national level.

=== Netherlands ===
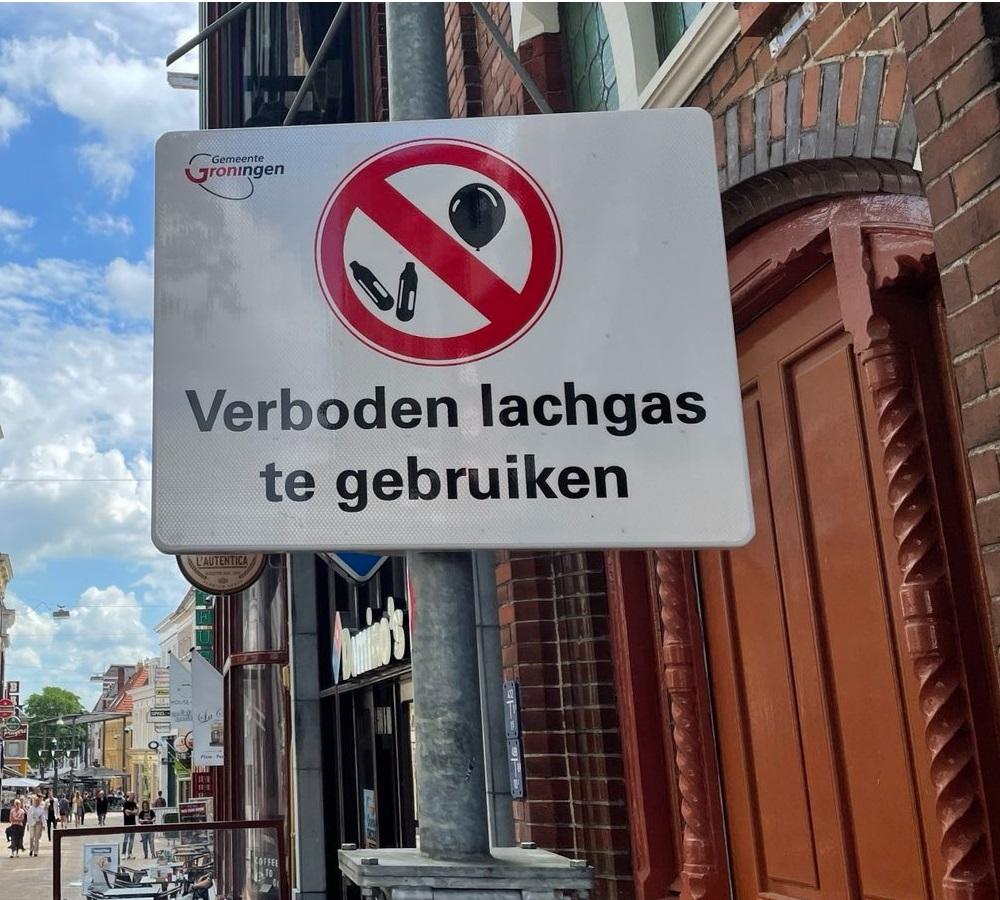
Sign stating "forbidden to use nitrous oxide" in the Poelestraat in Groningen which is also known as the main nightlife area with bars, pubs, and clubs. Since 1 January 2021, the use of nitrous oxide in the area has been prohibited.

Since 1 January 2023, the possession, importing, and sale of nitrous oxide are banned in the Netherlands, with exceptions for medical use and the food industry. It is illegal under the Opium Act.

=== Sweden ===
Using nitrous oxide for recreational use is called "boffning" as slang. It is not illegal, and whipped cream chargers with nitrous oxide can be purchased as kitchen supply. Most retailers have a voluntary age restriction of 18 years for purchase. At festivals or bigger events, sales have been stopped, referring to "environmental hazardous chemical handling".

=== Thailand ===
In 2021, Thailand banned recreational nitrous oxide balloons after discovering they could deprive users of oxygen, posing serious health risks. The Thai Food and Drug Administration warned against their use and distribution, with penalties for violators. Despite the ban, there have been reports of the product resurfacing in areas like Khao San Road in 2024, catering especially to foreign visitors.

In Thailand, nitrous oxide is not considered an illegal drug as it is used legally for anesthesia. However, people need permission from health authorities to use or sell them, ensuring they are used safely and legally.

=== United Kingdom ===
Supply of nitrous oxide for recreational purposes is illegal under the Misuse of Drugs Act 1971 and the Psychoactive Substances Act 2016. This means anyone found to be selling or giving away nitrous oxide for illicit purposes could face up to 14 years in prison and/or an unlimited fine.

On 8 November 2023, the British government categorised nitrous oxide as a class C drug, due to health risks and to reduce litter.

Slang terms used for the canisters in the United Kingdom include balloons, nos, whippits, laughing gas, hippie crack, chargers and noz.

=== United States ===
As of 2025, under United States federal law, possession of nitrous oxide was legal and not subject to DEA purview. It is, however, regulated by the Food and Drug Administration under the Food Drug and Cosmetics Act. Prosecution is possible under its "misbranding" clauses, prohibiting the sale or distribution of nitrous oxide for the purpose of human consumption (the recreational drug use market). Given the necessity of proving the intent of either buyer or seller in this case, though, such prosecutions are rare. A Congress bill proposed the Nitrous Oxide Safety Act, which would ban the sale of nitrous oxide consumer products.

Many states have laws regulating the possession, sale, and distribution of nitrous oxide; but these are normally limited to either banning distribution to minors, or setting an upper limit on the amount of nitrous oxide that may be sold without a special license, rather than banning possession or distribution completely. In most jurisdictions, as at the federal level, sale or distribution for the purpose of human consumption is illegal. In California, for instance, inhalation of nitrous oxide "for the purpose of causing euphoria, or for the purpose of changing in any manner one's mental processes" is an offense under its criminal code (Cal. Pen. Code, Sec. 381b). In most jurisdictions, small N_{2}O cartridges, used to make whipped cream, can be legally purchased by anyone. In some jurisdictions, sales of canned whipped cream using nitrous oxide are limited to adults.

From 2019 to 2023, adverse health outcomes from recreational nitrous oxide use increased sharply in Michigan, per a MMWR report in April 2025.

=== Vietnam ===
Vietnam has not officially banned the use of N_{2}O gas, but the government is considering stricter measures to control its recreational use.

== See also ==
- Dissociatives
  - PCP
  - Ketamine
  - Dextromethorphan
- Inhalant
- Psychoactive drug
