= Nitrous oxide (medication) =

Gas used as anesthetic and for pain relief

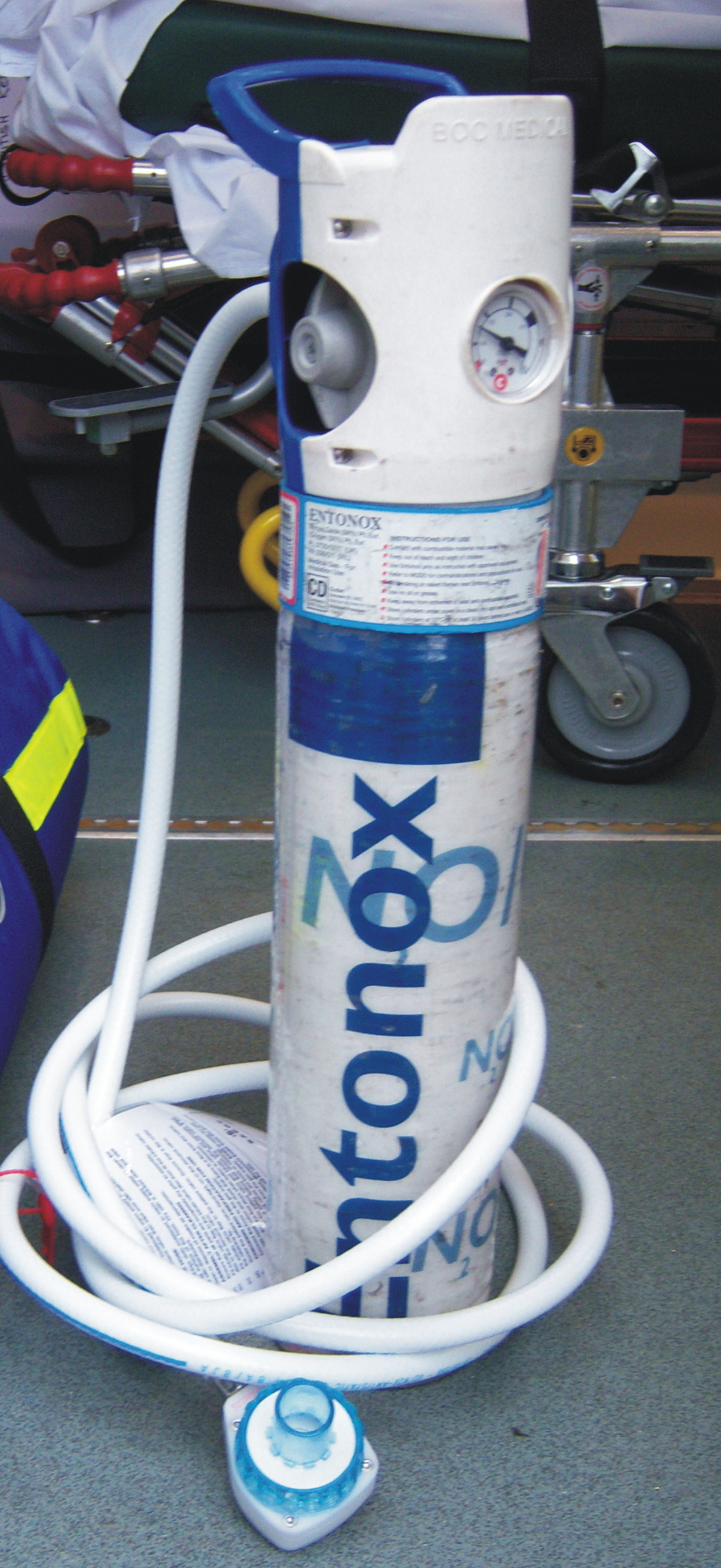
- Entonox CD cylinder and giving set

Combination of
- Nitrous oxide: Analgesic gas (usually 50%)
- Oxygen: Medical gas (usually 50%)

Clinical data
- Trade names: Entonox, Nitronox, others
- Routes of administration: Inhalation
- Drug class: NMDA receptor antagonist; Dissociative hallucinogen; Analgesic; General anesthetic
- ATC code: Nitrous oxide: N01AX13 (WHO); Oxygen: V03AN01 (WHO)

Legal status
- Legal status: 50/50 mix of nitrous oxide and oxygen: ℞ (prescription only)

Pharmacokinetic data
- Metabolism: Not metabolized
- Metabolites: None
- Onset of action: 30 seconds
- Duration of action: 1 minute
- Excretion: Exhaled

Identifiers
- CAS Number: Nitrous oxide: 10024-97-2; Oxygen: 7782-44-7
- PubChem CID: Nitrous oxide: 948; Oxygen: 977
- DrugBank: Nitrous oxide: 06690; Oxygen: DB09140
- ChemSpider: Nitrous oxide: 923; Oxygen: 952
- UNII: Nitrous oxide: K50XQU1029; Oxygen: S88TT14065
- ChEBI: Nitrous oxide: CHEBI:17045; Oxygen: CHEBI:27140
- ChEMBL: Nitrous oxide: ChEMBL1234579; Oxygen: ChEMBLCHEMBL1234886

Chemical and physical data
- Formula: N_{2}O
- Molar mass: 44.013 g·mol^{−1}
- 3D model (JSmol): Nitrous oxide: Interactive image
- SMILES: Nitrous oxide: [N-]=[N+]=O
- InChI: Nitrous oxide: InChI=1S/N2O/c1-2-3; Key:GQPLMRYTRLFLPF-UHFFFAOYSA-N

Nitrous oxide, as medical gas supply, is an inhaled gas used as pain medication, and is typically administered with 50% oxygen mix. It is often used together with other medications for anesthesia. Common uses include during childbirth, following trauma, and as part of end-of-life care. Onset of effect is typically within half a minute, and the effect lasts for about a minute.

Nitrous oxide was discovered between 1772 and 1793 and used for anesthesia in 1844. It is on the World Health Organization's List of Essential Medicines. It often comes as a 50/50 mixture with oxygen. Devices with a demand valve are available for self-administration. The setup and maintenance is relatively inexpensive for developing countries.

There are few side effects, other than vomiting, with short-term use. With long-term use anemia or numbness may occur. It should always be given with at least 21% oxygen. It is not recommended in people with a bowel obstruction or pneumothorax. Use in the early part of pregnancy is not recommended. It is possible to continue breastfeeding following use.

== History ==
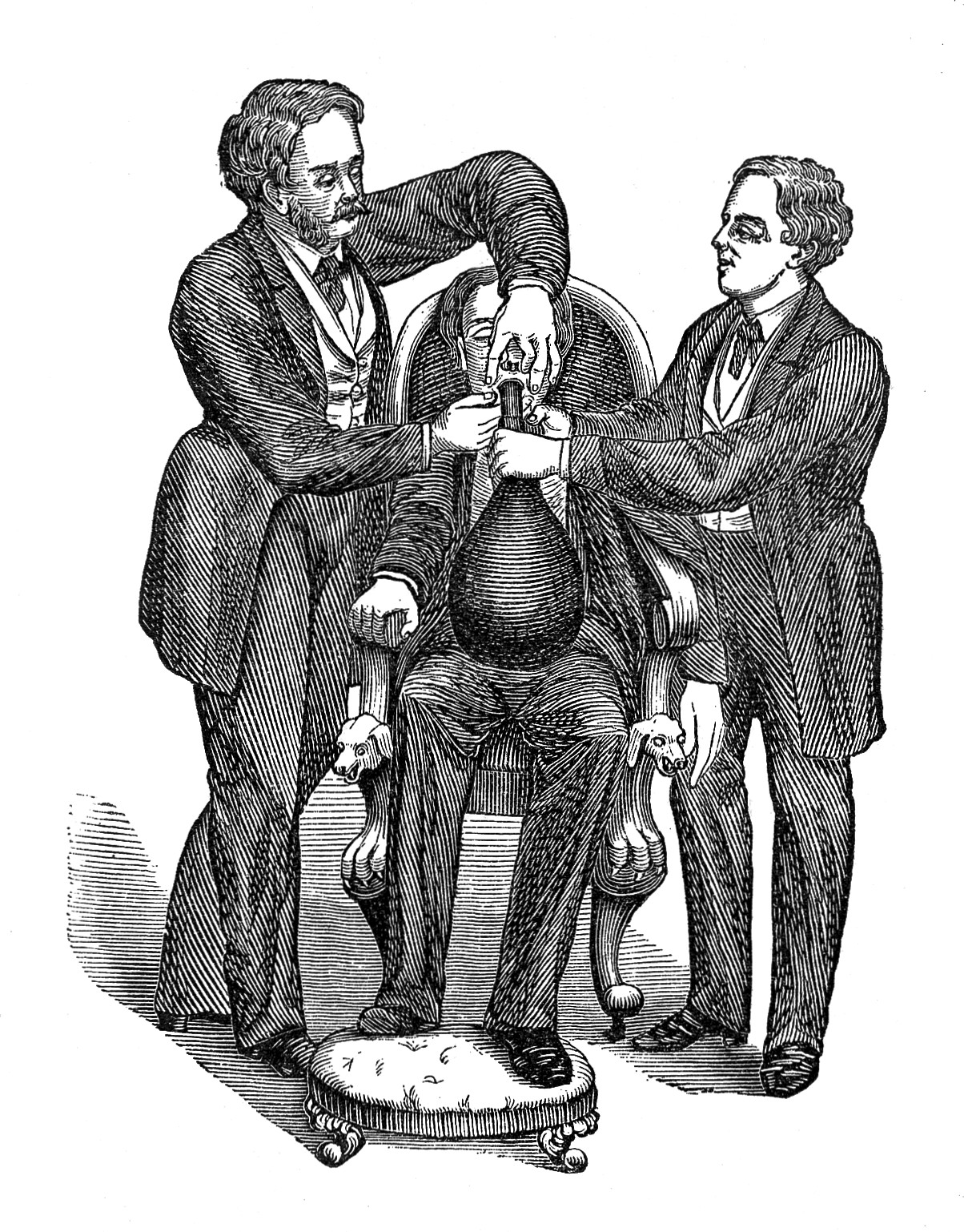
Administration of nitrous oxide, 1870

Pure N_{2}O was first used as a medical analgesic in December 1844, when Horace Wells made the first 12–15 dental operations with the gas in Hartford.

Its debut as a generally accepted method, however, came in 1863, when Gardner Quincy Colton introduced it more broadly at all the Colton Dental Association clinics, that he founded in New Haven and New York City.

The first devices used in dentistry to administer the gas consisted of a simple breathing bag made of rubber cloth.

Breathing the pure gas often caused hypoxia (oxygen insufficiency) and sometimes death by asphyxiation. Eventually practitioners became aware of the need to provide at least 21% oxygen content in the gas (the same percentage as in air). In 1911, the anaesthetist Arthur Ernest Guedel first described the use of self-administration of a nitrous oxide and oxygen mix. It was not until 1961 that the first paper was published by Michael Tunstall and others, describing the administration of a pre-mixed 50:50 nitrous oxide and oxygen mix, which led to the commercialisation of the product.

In 1970, Peter Baskett recognised that pre-mixed nitrous oxide and oxygen mix could have an important part to play in the provision of pre-hospital pain relief management, provided by ambulance personnel. Baskett contacted the Chief Ambulance Officer for the Gloucestershire Ambulance Brigade, Alan Withnell, to suggest this idea. This gained traction when Baskett negotiated with the British Oxygen Company, the availability of pre-mixed nitrous oxide and oxygen mix apparatus for training. Regular training sessions began at Frenchay Hospital (Bristol) and a pilot study was run in Gloucestershire (in which ambulances were crewed by a driver and one of the new highly trained ambulance men), the results of this trial were published in 1970.

Today the nitrous oxide is administered in hospitals by a relative analgesia machine, which includes several improvements such as flowmeters and constant-flow regulators, an anaesthetic vaporiser, a medical ventilator, and a scavenger system, and delivers a precisely dosed and breath-actuated flow of nitrous oxide mixed with oxygen.

The machine used in dentistry is much simpler, and is meant to be used by the patient in a fully conscious state. The gas is delivered through a demand-valve inhaler over the nose, which will only release gas when the patient inhales through it.

== Medical uses ==
Nitrous oxide (N_{2}O) is itself active (does not require any changes in the body to become active), and so has an onset in roughly the lung–brain circulation time with peak action 30 seconds after the start of administration. It is removed from the body unchanged via the lungs, and does not accumulate under normal conditions, explaining the rapid offset of around 60 seconds. It is effective in managing pain during labor and delivery.

Nitrous oxide has been shown to be an effective and safe treatment for alcohol withdrawal.

Nitrous oxide is more soluble than oxygen and nitrogen, so will tend to diffuse into any air spaces within the body. This makes it dangerous to use in patients with pneumothorax or those who have recently been scuba diving, and there are cautions over its use with any bowel obstruction.

Its analgesic effect is strong (equivalent to 15 mg of subcutaneous route morphine) and characterised by rapid onset and offset, i.e. it is very fast-acting and wears off very quickly.

When used in combination with other anesthetics gases, nitrous oxide causes a dose dependent increased respiratory rate and decreased tidal volumes, the net effect is a lower minute ventilation. Like volatile anesthetics, it increases cerebral blood flow and intracranial pressure. However, contrary to volatile anesthetics, it leads to an increase in cerebral metabolic rate of oxygen.

== Contraindications ==
N_{2}O should not be used in patients with bowel obstruction, pneumothorax, or middle ear or sinus disease, or who have had a recent intraocular injection of gas and should also not be used on any patient who has been scuba diving within the preceding 24 hours or in violently disturbed psychiatric patients. There are also clinical cautions in place for the first two trimesters of pregnancy and in patients with decreased levels of consciousness.

== Composition ==
The gas is a mixture of half nitrous oxide (N_{2}O) and half oxygen (O_{2}). The ability to combine N_{2}O and oxygen at high pressure while remaining in the gaseous form is caused by the Poynting effect (after John Henry Poynting, an English physicist). The Poynting effect involves the dissolution of gaseous O_{2} when bubbled through liquid N_{2}O, with vaporisation of the liquid to form a gaseous O_{2}/N_{2}O mixture.

Since the two substances are homogeneously mixed gases, the cylinder delivers a consistent 50/50 mixture all the way down to empty, even if the cylinder adiabatically cools somewhat from the discharge.

Some N_{2}O may condense into a liquid if the cylinder is cooled to low temperatures (−7 °C or below), which can be dangerous if unaddressed. This occurs most easily with partially used / lower pressure cylinders. Even after warming the contents back into a gaseous state, they may remain nonhomogenous for days. Thus it is typically instructed to warm cylinders in a horizontal orientation (to maximize heat transfer) for a 48 hour period, then rehomogenize the gas by inverting the cylinder three times.

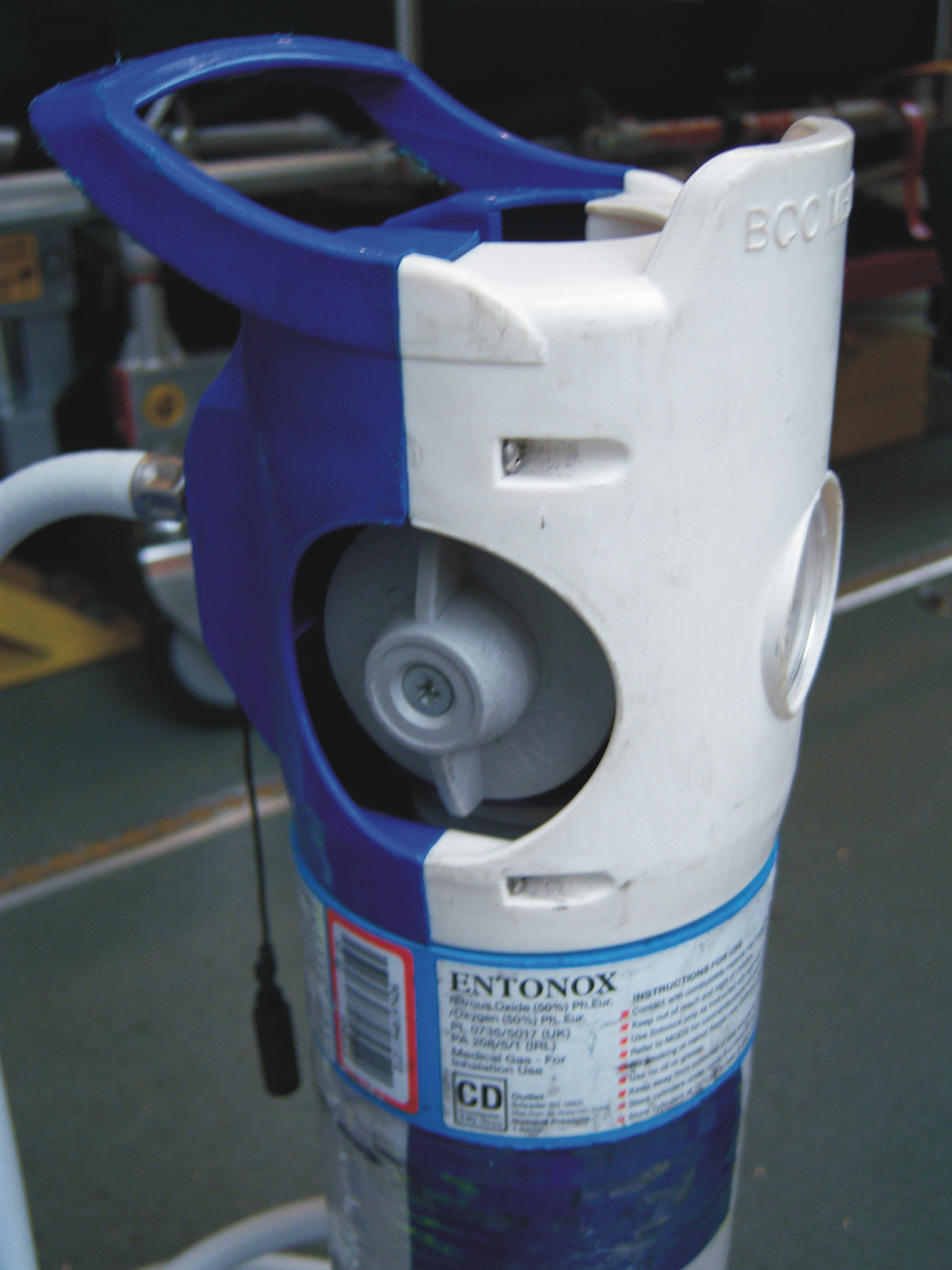
Distinct blue and white cap of an Entonox cylinder

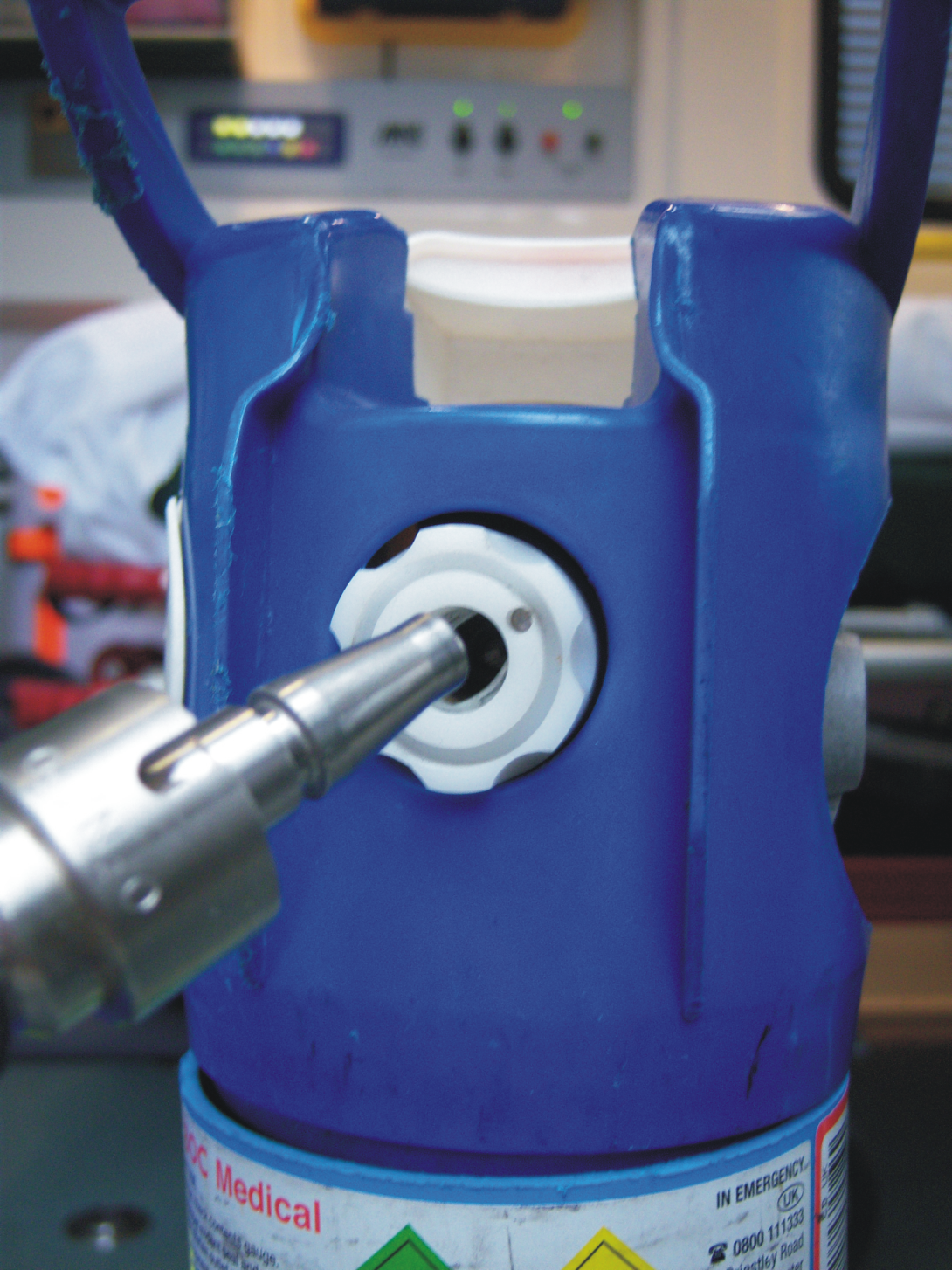
Typical Schrader valve attachment, making the gas usable only with demand based giving sets

== Administration ==
Surgeons at Endell Street Military Hospital operating on an anaesthetised soldier during World War I. In the foreground, the anaesthetist is holding a mask in front of the patient's face.

The gas is self-administered through a demand valve, using a mouthpiece, bite block or face mask. Self-administration of Entonox is safe because if enough is inhaled to start to induce anaesthesia, the patient becomes unable to hold the valve, and so will drop it and soon exhale the residual gas. This means that unlike other anaesthetic gases, it does not require the presence of an anaesthetist for administration. The 50% oxygen in Entonox ensures the person will have sufficient oxygen in their alveoli and conducting airways for a short period of apnea to be safe.

== Mechanism of action ==
The pharmacological mechanism of action of N_{2}O in medicine is not fully known. However, it has been shown to directly modulate a broad range of ligand-gated ion channels, and this likely plays a major role in many of its effects. It moderately blocks NMDAR and β_{2}-subunit-containing nACh channels, weakly inhibits AMPA, kainate, GABA_{C} and 5-HT_{3} receptors, and slightly potentiates GABA_{A} and glycine receptors. It also has been shown to activate two-pore-domain K^{+} channels. While N_{2}O affects quite a few ion channels, its anesthetic, hallucinogenic and euphoriant effects are likely caused predominantly, or fully, via inhibition of NMDA receptor-mediated currents. In addition to its effects on ion channels, N_{2}O may act to imitate nitric oxide (NO) in the central nervous system, and this may be related to its analgesic and anxiolytic properties. Nitrous oxide is 30 to 40 times more soluble than nitrogen.

== Society and culture ==
Nitronox was a registered trademark of the BOC Group between 1966 and 1999, and was reregistered by Hs Tm Inc since 2005 It is also colloquially known as "gas and air" in the United Kingdom.

== Research ==
Investigational trials show potential for antidepressant applications of N_{2}O, especially for treatment-resistant forms of depression, and it is rapid-acting. In a phase 2 clinical trial, a treatment with 25% nitrous oxide had comparable efficacy to 50% nitrous oxide but was associated with significantly fewer adverse effects.
