= Intensity (physics) =

Power transferred per unit area

In physics and many other areas of science and engineering the intensity or flux of radiant energy is the power transferred per unit area, where the area is measured on the plane perpendicular to the direction of propagation of the energy. (Note: The terms intensity and flux have multiple, inconsistent, definitions in physics and related fields. This article covers the concept of power per unit area, whatever one calls it. In radiometry the terms intensity and flux have different meanings, not covered here.) In the SI system, it has units watts per square metre (W/m^{2}), or kg⋅s^{−3} in base units. Intensity is used most frequently with waves such as acoustic waves (sound), matter waves such as electrons in electron microscopes, and electromagnetic waves such as light or radio waves, in which case the average power transfer over one period of the wave is used. Intensity can be applied to other circumstances where energy is transferred. For example, one could calculate the intensity of the kinetic energy carried by drops of water from a garden sprinkler.

The word "intensity" as used here is not synonymous with "strength", "amplitude", "magnitude", or "level", as it sometimes is in colloquial speech.

Intensity can be found by taking the energy density (energy per unit volume) at a point in space and multiplying it by the velocity at which the energy is moving. The resulting vector has the units of power divided by area (i.e., surface power density). The intensity of a wave is proportional to the square of its amplitude. For example, the intensity of an electromagnetic wave is proportional to the square of the wave's electric field amplitude.

== Mathematical description ==
The intensity or flux of electromagnetic radiation is equal to the time average of the Poynting vector over the wave's period. For radiation propagating through a typical medium the energy density of the radiation, $u$, is related to the Poynting vector $\mathbf{S}$ by

$$-\frac{\partial u}{\partial t}=\nabla\cdot\mathbf{S},$$
which is derived from Poynting's theorem.

Integrating over a volume of space gives
$$-\iiint\frac{\partial}{\partial t}\frac{dU}{dV}\, dV=\iiint(\nabla\cdot\mathbf{S})\, dV$$
where $U$ is the energy of the electromagnetic radiation.

Applying the divergence theorem, the rate of flow of energy out of the volume is seen to be related to the surface integral of the Poynting vector over the surface of the volume of space:

$\frac{dU}{dt} = -$ $\scriptstyle A$ $\mathbf{S}\cdot d\mathbf{A},$

=== Point sources ===
A common example is the intensity or flux of a point source of given power output $P$. Considering a spherical volume centered on the source, the formula above becomes

$P=\left \langle -\frac{dU}{dt} \right \rangle =$$\langle S \rangle$ $\scriptstyle A$ $d\mathbf{A},$

where the angle brackets denote a time average over the period of the waves. Since the surface area of a sphere of radius $r$ is $A = 4\pi r^2$ this gives
$$P = \langle S \rangle \cdot 4\pi r^2,$$
therefore the intensity from the point source at distance $r$ is
$$I=\frac{P}{4\pi r^2}.$$
This is known as the inverse-square law.

=== Electromagnetic waves ===
For a monochromatic propagating electromagnetic wave such as a plane wave or a Gaussian beam travelling in a non-magnetic medium, the time-averaged Poynting vector is related to the amplitude of the electric field, E, by
$$\left\langle\mathsf{S}\right\rangle = \frac{cn\epsilon_0}{2}  E^2,$$
where c is the speed of light in vacuum, n is the refractive index of the medium, and $\epsilon_0$ is the vacuum permittivity.

The relationship to intensity can also be seen by considering the time-averaged energy density of the wave:
$$\left\langle U \right \rangle = \frac{n^2 \epsilon_0}{2} E^2.$$
The local intensity is just the energy density times the wave velocity $\tfrac{c}{n}$:
$$I = \frac{\mathrm{c} n \epsilon_0}{2} E^2.$$

For non-monochromatic waves, the intensity contributions of different spectral components can simply be added.

The treatment above does not hold for arbitrary electromagnetic fields, but it is still often true that the magnitude of the time-averaged Poynting vector is proportional to the time-averaged energy density by a factor $c$:

$$I = \langle S\rangle\propto c\langle U\rangle$$

An evanescent wave may have a finite electrical amplitude while not transferring any power. The intensity of an evanescent wave can be defined as the magnitude of the Poynting vector.

== Electron beams ==
For electron beams, intensity is the probability of electrons reaching some particular position on a detector (e.g. a charge-coupled device) which is used to produce images that are interpreted in terms of both microstructure of inorganic or biological materials, as well as atomic scale structure. The map of the intensity of scattered electrons or x-rays as a function of direction is also extensively used in crystallography.

== Alternative definitions ==
In photometry and radiometry intensity has a different meaning: it is the luminous or radiant power per unit solid angle. This can cause confusion in optics, where intensity can mean any of radiant intensity, luminous intensity or irradiance, depending on the background of the person using the term. Radiance is also sometimes called intensity, especially by astronomers and astrophysicists, and in heat transfer.

== See also ==
- Field strength
- Sound intensity
- Magnitude (astronomy)
