= Station Outlet =

Station Outlets (US) or Terminal Units (ISO, CSA) consist of an outlet port with color-coded faceplate attached to a medical gas supply line, and primary and secondary check valves which open and close automatically upon use and disengagement from the system. In most jurisdictions, station outlets are required to be equipped with safety systems that prevent cross-connection errors, such as connecting a medical air flowmeter to an oxygen port. Hospitals mainly use DISS connections, though a wide variety of quick-connect adapters, based on male strikers and female outlet ports, are still in use today. These latter types are easier to connect, but are more prone to leaks and failure.

== Types ==
=== Diameter Index Safety System (DISS) ===
The Diameter Index Safety System, or DISS, was designed in 1959 by the Compressed Gas Association (CGA) specifically for medical gases at 200 psi or less. It uses unique, gas-specific threaded connections to fit equipment to station outlets. It is also used for the connection of additional features to equipment, such as in fixing a suction canister to a suction (Medical vacuum) regulator. Although DISS takes more time to affix, this has become the most popular choice as a threaded connection cannot disengage on its own.

=== Puritan-Bennett ===
The Puritan-Bennett/Beacon quick-connect system uses geometrically coded probes. Equipment is disengaged by pressing, and releasing, a button on the station outlet. Persistent attempts to remove equipment while keeping the button pressed has potential to result in damage leading to latching/connection malfunctions.

=== Ohio/Ohmeda ===
The female outlet port for the Ohio/Ohmeda system consists of a disk with slots placed at positions unique to each specific gas. After insertion, male strikers may be disengaged by twisting the inlet so as to activate a spring-release mechanism. The flat outlet ports ensure no injury if a patient or health-care worker should fall into the wall; a consideration when dealing with the mentally ill or those with neuro- or musculodegenerative disorders. However, the twisting of the disengage mechanism may result in the tangling of wires or other equipment in crowded areas.

=== Chemetron/NCG ===
The Chemetron/NCG system resembles a simple electrical plug in appearance. Although it is very easy to connect and disconnect, this advantage poses a risk should it be dislodged accidentally. Additionally, its straight valve does not allow for the connection of flowmeters, necessitating the purchase and use of additional equipment.

=== Hansen Schrader ===
This unusual system consists of steel strikers and ports. The ports have a spring-loaded collar, which will be pulled back to expose a series of balls located on the inner lip of the port. The positioning of these balls is specific to each gas. At this point, the male striker may be inserted. It is possible this system never caught on due to its lack of colour-coding and labels, along with the difficulty of engaging the striker.

=== Oxequip Medstar/Canadian Liquid Air (CLA) ===
These consist of steel strikers ("bayonets") with holes for inlet ports. Like keys, the strikers have grooves and ridges in variable positions. They lack colour-coding and are easily disengaged.

== See also ==
Medical gas supply
