= Sidney Yankauer =

American Otolaryngologist

- Born: 1872; New York
- Died: August 27, 1932 (aged 59–60); Manhattan County, New York
- Education: College of Physicians and Surgeons
- Known for: Yankauer suction tip
- Scientific career
- Fields: Surgery, otolaryngology
- Workplaces: Mount Sinai Hospital

Sidney Yankauer (1872–1932) was an American otolaryngologist. A graduate of the City College of New York and the College of Physicians and Surgeons, he was among the first surgeons to specialize in problems of the ear, nose and throat. He served as the first director of laryngology at Mount Sinai Hospital in New York City.

Yankauer shared an office with his wife, otolaryngologist Grace Prior, until her death from a fall in 1914. He remarried and had one child. A common medical suction device, the Yankauer suction tip, is named for him.

== Early life ==
Yankauer was born in New York. His parents were German Jewish immigrants to the United States. He completed undergraduate studies at the City College of New York. He graduated from the College of Physicians and Surgeons in 1893.

== Career ==
Following an internship at Mount Sinai Hospital in New York City, he took a position there. He worked with outpatient surgery patients for several years. Though otolaryngology was in its infancy, he increasingly focused on problems of the ear, nose and throat.

During World War I, Yankauer served as a United States Army major in France, where he worked at a hospital largely staffed by Mount Sinai personnel. A story from the hospital in France spoke to Yankauer's ingenuity, and it was told at Mount Sinai for many years. Yankauer and Dr. Howard Lilienthal were working when the quartermaster accidentally locked a safe with the key inside it; the safe contained all the men's money. Yankauer devised a new key so that the safe could be opened and the money retrieved.

Yankauer was president of the Mount Sinai Alumni Association in 1916.

In 1917, laryngology was established as its own department at Mount Sinai with six surgical ward beds, and Yankauer was named its director. He was known for his skill at bronchoscopy; in 1905, he had been the first physician in New York City to use the procedure to remove a foreign body from a patient's airway.

== Innovations ==
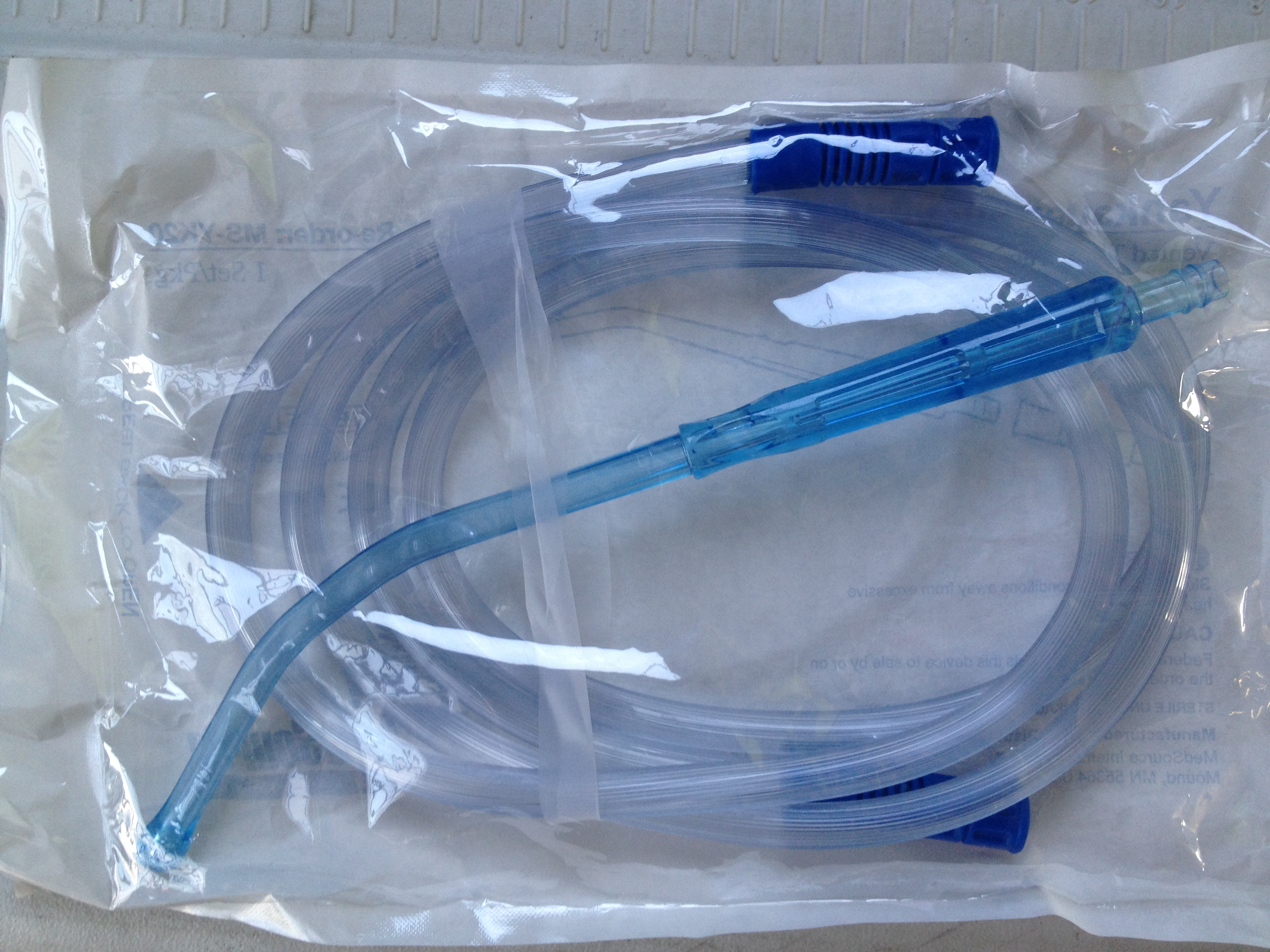
Modern version of the Yankauer suction tip

Known for his medical innovations, Yankauer devised a suction device for the mouth known as the Yankauer suction tip. The device remains in use in modern medical settings.

In about 1904, Yankauer designed a wire-mesh anesthesia device known as the Yankauer mask. Ten years later, anesthesiologist James Tayloe Gwathmey modified the Yankauer mask so that oxygen could be administered along with the anesthetic. This device became known as the Yankauer-Gwathmey mask, and a subsequent modification became known as the modified Yankauer-Gwathmey mask. Yankauer was president of the American Broncho-Esophagological Association in 1927.

== Personal ==
Yankauer's wife, Grace Prior, was also an otolaryngologist and the couple shared an office. They did not have any children. She died in 1914 after falling out of a window at the couple's tenth floor apartment on Park Avenue. The death was ruled accidental; servants saw her lose her balance while trying to secure a loose screw on a window screen.

Yankauer married Margaret Kerrins, a Mount Sinai nursing administrator, in 1919. They had one child.

Yankauer died of heart disease at Mount Sinai Hospital in 1932.
