= Aspirator (medicine) =

Suction device removing bodily fluids

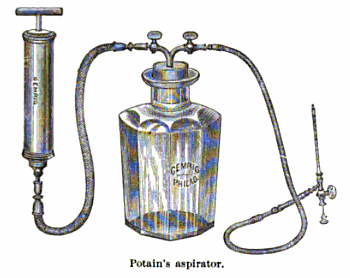
Potain's aspirator

A medical aspirator is a suction machine used to remove mucus, blood, and other bodily fluids from a patient. They can be used during surgical procedures but an operating theater is generally equipped with a central system of vacuum tubes. Most aspirators are therefore portable, for use in ambulances and nursing homes, and can run on AC or battery power. They consist of a vacuum pump, a vacuum regulator and gauge, a collection canister, and sometimes a bacterial filter. Plastic tubing is used to continuously draw fluid into the collection canister.

In the past manually operated aspirators were used such as Potain's aspirator.

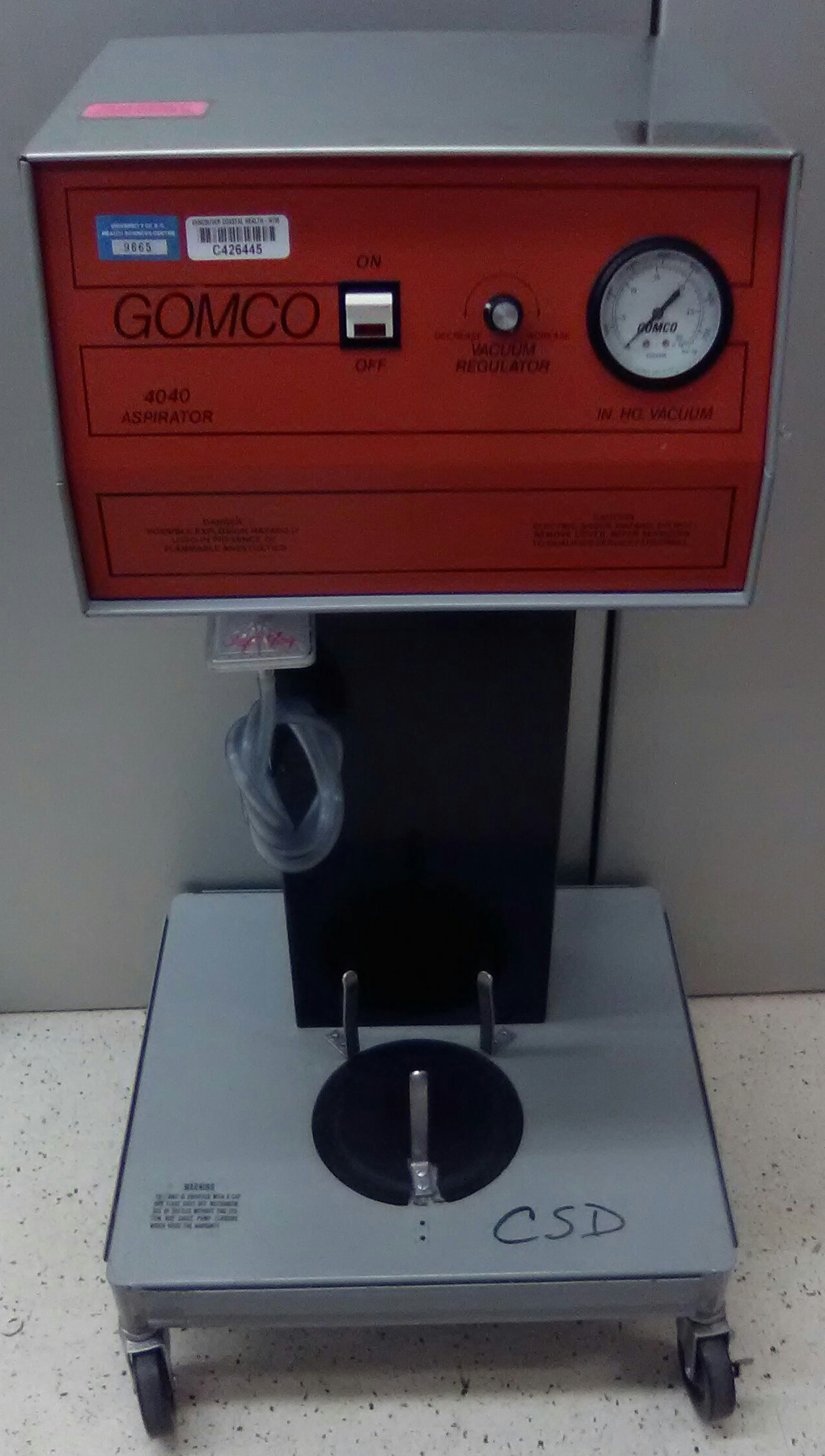
The contemporary Gomco 4040 Aspirator

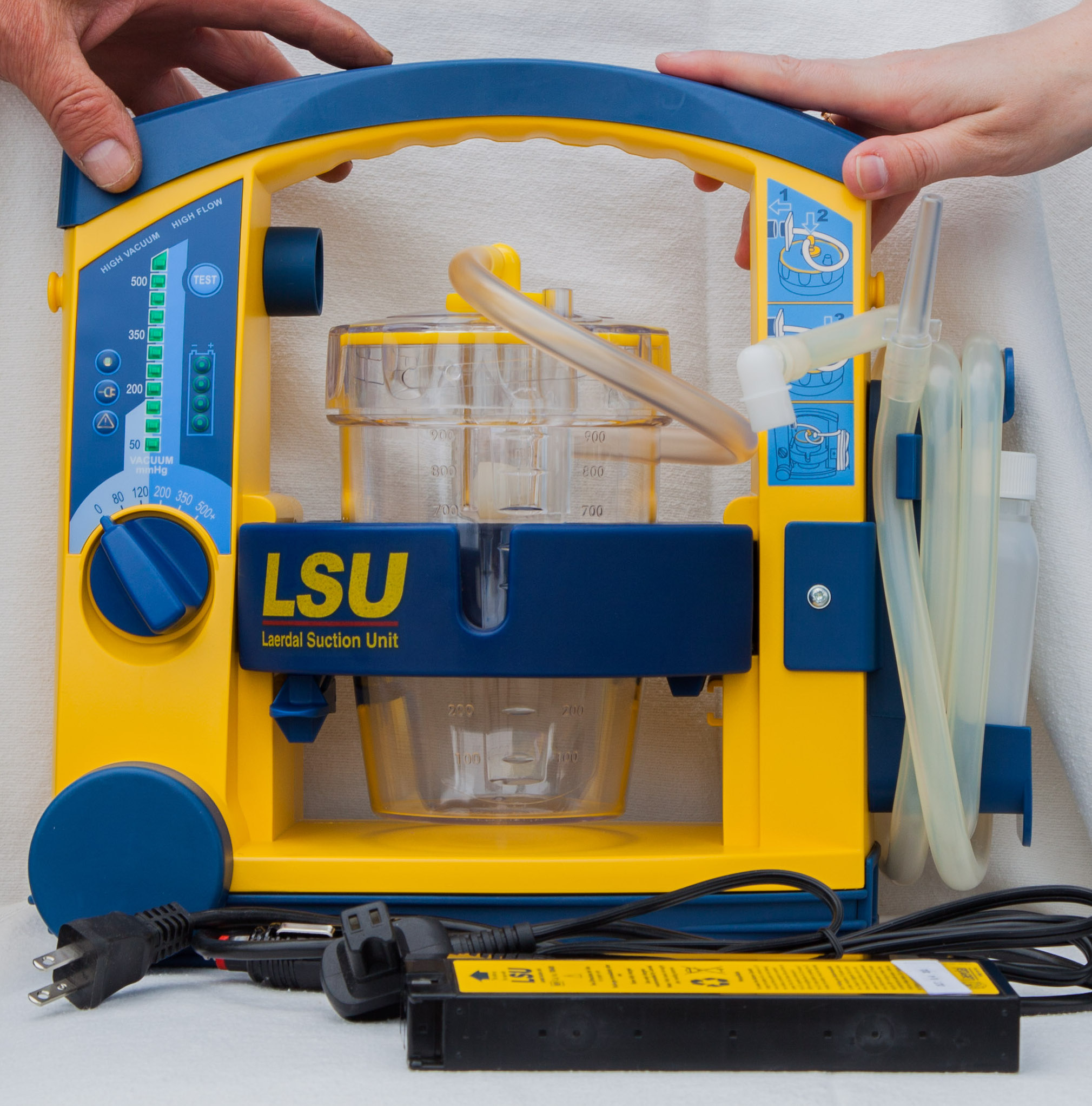
A Laerdal portable suction machine with battery and power cord.

== See also ==
- Suction (medicine)
