= Dental suction =

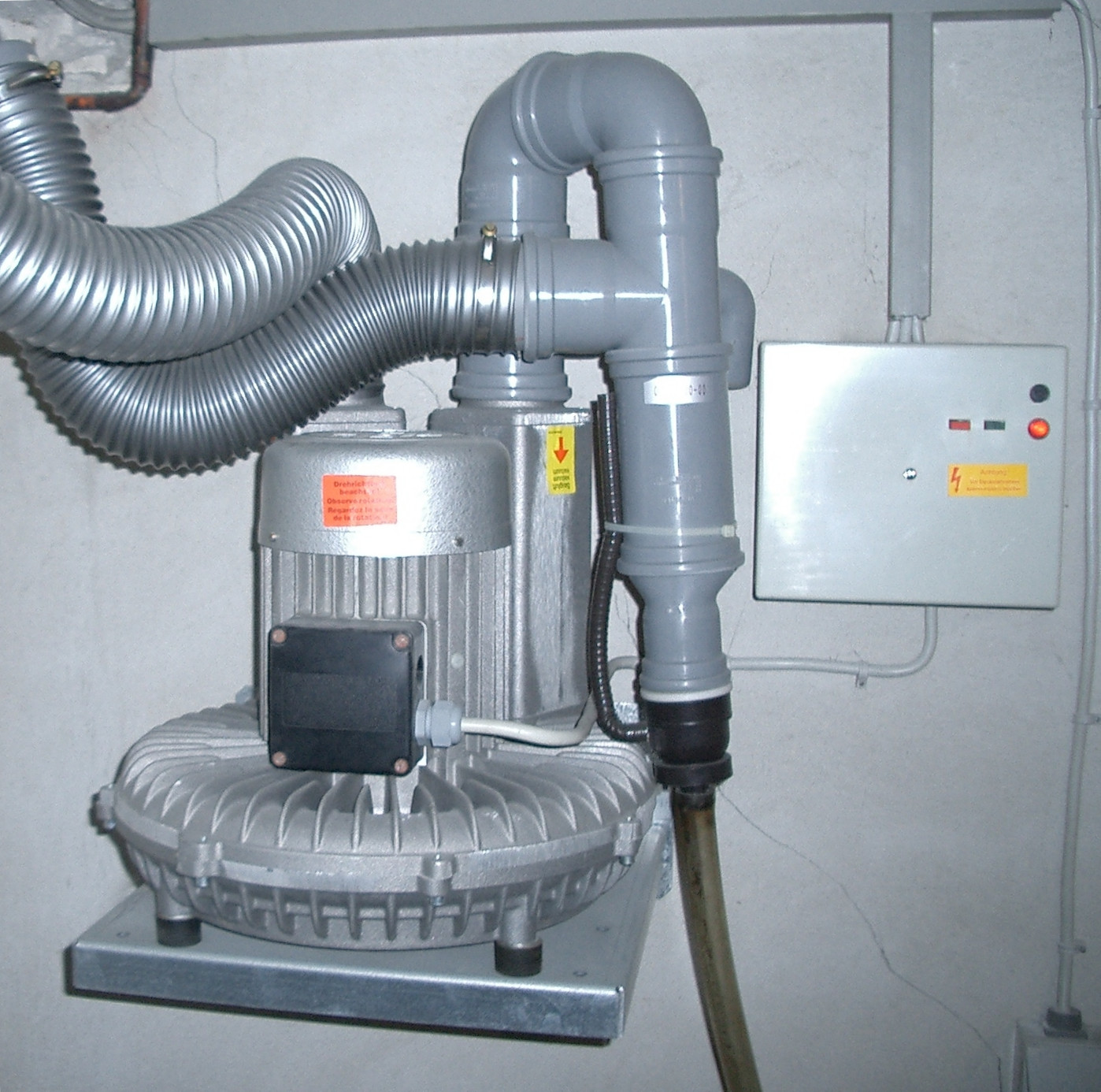
A dental vacuum system for central suction

A dental suction, also known as a dental evacuation system or dental vacuum, is a suction device used during dental treatment to remove saliva, blood, irrigation water, and debris from the patient's mouth. Suction maintains a clear, dry operative field and prevents obstruction during procedures performed with pneumatic motors (such as dental drill) or ultrasonic scalers. In professional usage, the suction systems are termed high-volume evacuators (HVE) or saliva ejectors, depending on their design and clinical application. A suction device is considered an HVE when it can move a substantial amount of air in a short time. Dental HVEs typically feature a broad tip—about 8 millimetres (0.3 in) or more in diameter—connected to a vacuum system capable of drawing up to 100 cubic feet per minute (2.8 m^{3}/min) of air. Because a saliva ejector has a much narrower opening and lower airflow, it does not qualify as an HVE.

Dental suction systems are generally divided into intraoral and extraoral types. Intraoral suction operates inside the mouth to remove fluids and aerosols near the treatment site. Extraoral suction devices are positioned outside the mouth to capture droplets and airborne particles produced during high-speed instrumentation, thereby reducing aerosol contamination in clinical environments.
