= Medical gas supply =

Systems to provide gases for medical use in healthcare facilities

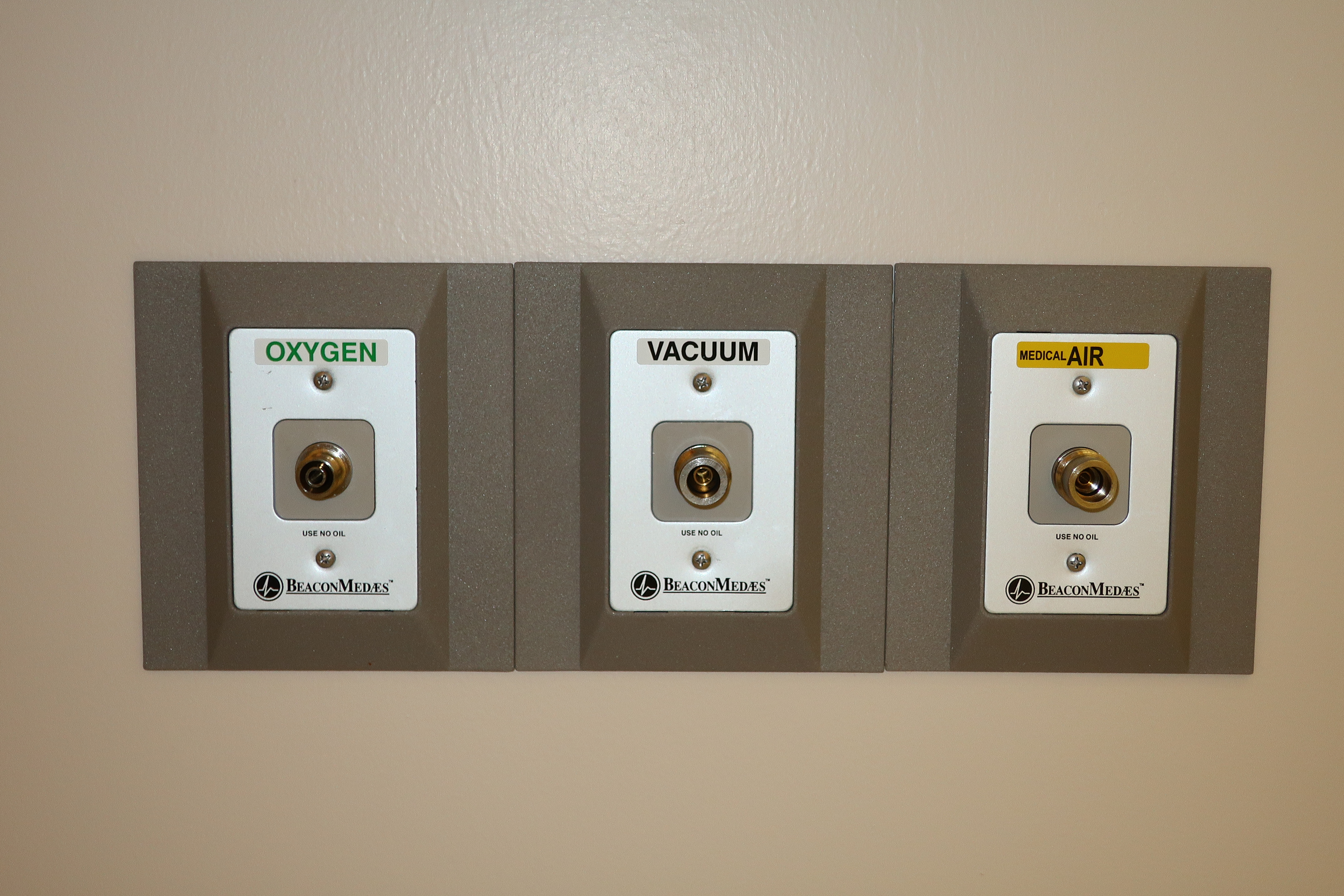
BeaconMedaes oxygen, vacuum, and medical air medical gas supply outlets on a ceiling at Campbell County Memorial Hospital in Gillette, Wyoming

Medical gas supply systems in hospitals and other healthcare facilities are utilized to supply specialized gases and gas mixtures to various parts of the facility. Products handled by such systems typically include:

- Oxygen
- Medical air
- Nitrous oxide
- Nitrogen
- Carbon dioxide
- Medical vacuum
- Waste anaesthetic gas disposal (WAGD; US usage) or anaesthetic gas scavenging system (ISO)

Source equipment systems are generally required to be monitored by alarm systems at the point of supply for abnormal (high or low) gas pressure in areas such as general ward, operating theatres, intensive care units, recovery rooms, or major treatment rooms. Equipment is connected to the medical gas pipeline system via station outlets (US) or terminal units (ISO).

Medical gas systems are commonly color coded to identify their contents, but as coding systems and requirements (such as those for bottled gas) vary by jurisdiction, the text or labeling is the most reliable guide to the contents. Emergency shut-off valves, or zone valves, are often installed in order to stop gas flowing to an area in the event of fire or substantial leak, as well as for service. Valves may be positioned at the entrance to departments, with access provided via emergency pull-out windows.

== Oxygen ==
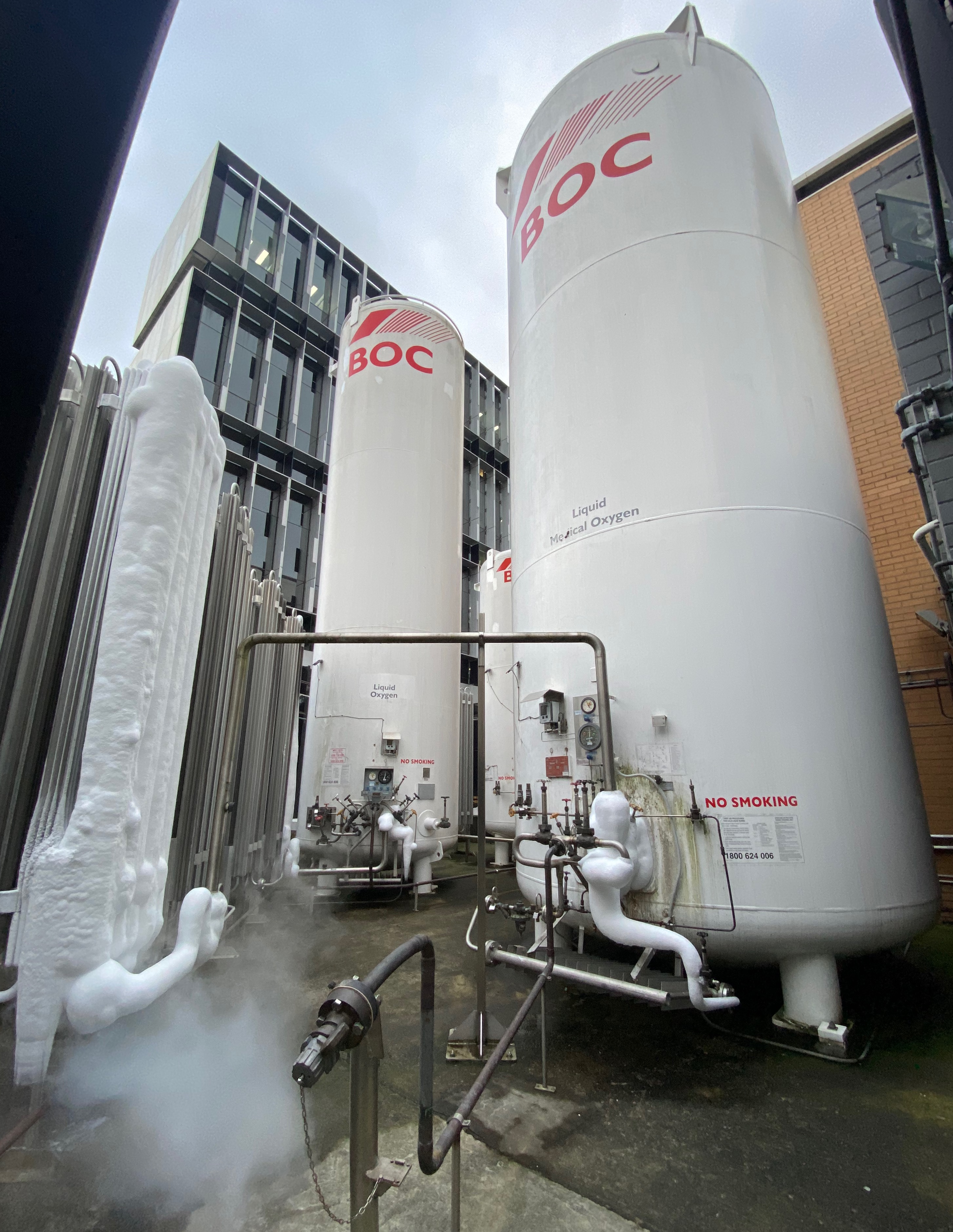
Medical oxygen storage tanks at the Royal Women's Hospital, Melbourne, Australia

Oxygen may be used for patients requiring supplemental oxygen via mask. Usually accomplished by a large storage system of liquid oxygen at the hospital which is evaporated into a concentrated oxygen supply, pressures are usually around 3.45 bar (345 kPa; 50.0 psi) in the US, or in the UK and Europe, 4.4 bar (440 kPa; 64 psi). This arrangement is described as a vacuum insulated evaporator or bulk tank. In small medical centers with a low patient capacity, oxygen is usually supplied by a manifold of multiple high-pressure cylinders. In areas where a bulk system or high-pressure cylinder manifold is not suitable, oxygen may be supplied by an oxygen concentrator. However, on site production of oxygen is still a relatively new technology.

== Medical air ==
Medical air is compressed air supplied by a special air compressor, through a dryer (in order to maintain correct dew point levels), and distributed to patient care areas by half hard BS:EN 13348 copper pipe and also use isolation ball valve for operating the services of compressed air 4 bar. It is also called medical air 4 bar. In smaller facilities, medical air may also be supplied via high-pressure cylinders. Pressures are maintained around 345–380 kPa (50.0–55.1 psi). If not used correctly it can be harmful to humans.

== Nitrous oxide ==
Nitrous oxide is supplied to various surgical suites for its anaesthetic functions during preoperative procedures. It is delivered to the hospital in high-pressure cylinders and supplied through the Medical Gas system. Some bulk systems exist, but are no longer installed due to environmental concerns and overall reduced consumption of nitrous oxide. System pressures are around 345 kPa (50.0 psi), 4 bar (400 kPa; 58 psi) UK.

== Nitrogen ==
Nitrogen is typically used to power pneumatic surgical equipment during various procedures, and is supplied by high-pressure cylinders. Pressures range around 1.2 MPa (170 psi) to various locations.

== Instrument air/surgical air ==
Like nitrogen, instrument air is used to power surgical equipment. However, it is generated on site by an air compressor (similar to a medical air compressor) rather than high-pressure cylinders. Early air compressors could not offer the purity required to drive surgical equipment. However, this has changed and instrument air is becoming a popular alternative to nitrogen. As with nitrogen, pressures range around 1.2 MPa (170 psi). UK systems are supplied at 11 bar (1.1 MPa; 160 psi) to the local area and regulated down to 7–8 bar (700–800 kPa; 100–120 psi) at point of use.

== Carbon dioxide ==
This gas is typically used pure for insufflation during surgery, but can also be used in its liquid form for cryotherapy or local analgesia. Mixed with other gases, it can be used for sterilisation of equipment, anaesthesia, and stimulation of the respiratory system.

A mixture of 5% carbon dioxide in oxygen is called carbogen and is used in the investigation and treatment of various respiratory conditions, such as to stimulate breathing after a period of apnoea, and managing chronic respiratory obstruction.

== Medical vacuum ==
Medical vacuum in a hospital supports suction equipment and evacuation procedures, supplied by vacuum pump systems exhausting to the atmosphere. Vacuum will fluctuate across the pipeline, but is generally maintained around −75 kPa (−560 mmHg; −22 inHg), −450 mmHg (−60 kPa; −18 inHg) UK.

== Waste anaesthetic gas disposal/anaesthetic gas scavenging system ==
Waste anaesthetic gas disposal (WAGD), or anaesthetic gas scavenging system, is used in hospital anaesthesia evacuation procedures. Although it is similar to a medical vacuum system, some building codes require anaesthetic gases to be scavenged separately. Scavenging systems do not need to be as powerful as medical vacuum systems, and can be maintained around −50 to −65 kPa (−380 to −490 mmHg; −15 to −19 inHg).

== Medical gas mixtures ==
There are many gas mixtures used for clinical and medical applications. They are often used for patient diagnostics such as lung function testing or blood gas analysis. Test gases are also used to calibrate and maintain medical devices used for the delivery of anaesthetic gases. In laboratories, culture growth applications include controlled aerobic or anaerobic incubator atmospheres for biological cell culture or tissue growth. Controlled aerobic conditions are created using mixtures rich in oxygen and anaerobic conditions are created using mixtures rich in hydrogen or carbon dioxide. Supply pressure is 4 bar (400 kPa; 58 psi).

Two common medical gas mixtures are entonox and heliox.

== See also ==
Station outlet
