= Scavenger system =

Medical device used to gather gas or aerosolized medication in clinical settings

A scavenger system is a medical device used in hospitals. It is used to gather anaesthetic gases, after it is exhaled from the patient or left the area of the patient, and transport it to the atmosphere, skipping the closed environment of the operating room. Often used to collect anesthesia, it can also be used to collect any type of gas or aerosolized medicine that is intended only for the patient and should not be breathed in by any other medical personnel.

In the operating room the anaesthetic gas scavenging system collects and removes waste gases from the patient breathing circuit and the patient ventilation circuit. In most jurisdictions, there is a legal requirement to scavenge waste gases to maintain the level of waste gases in the operating room below the legally acceptable limit. For example, in the UK the limits are typically 100ppm for nitrous oxide and 50ppm for halogenated volatile anaesthetic agents (except halothane which is 10ppm). Other jurisdictions have different requirements for local environmental contamination, for example, nitrous oxide maximum 25ppm and halogenated volatile gases maximum 2ppm. In addition to the legal requirement there is an occupational health requirement to maintain a safe workplace and limit exposure to potentially harmful gases.

The basic functional components of an anaesthetic gas scavenging system are as follows:

1. A collecting assembly / shroud with a relief valve by which the waste gas leaves the breathing or ventilation circuit.
2. A transfer system of tubing to conduct waste gases to the Scavenging Interface.
3. The scavenging interface, and
4. A disposal line to conduct the waste gas to a passive evacuation system, or a medical vacuum system via a station outlet.
