= Yankauer suction tip =

Medical instrument

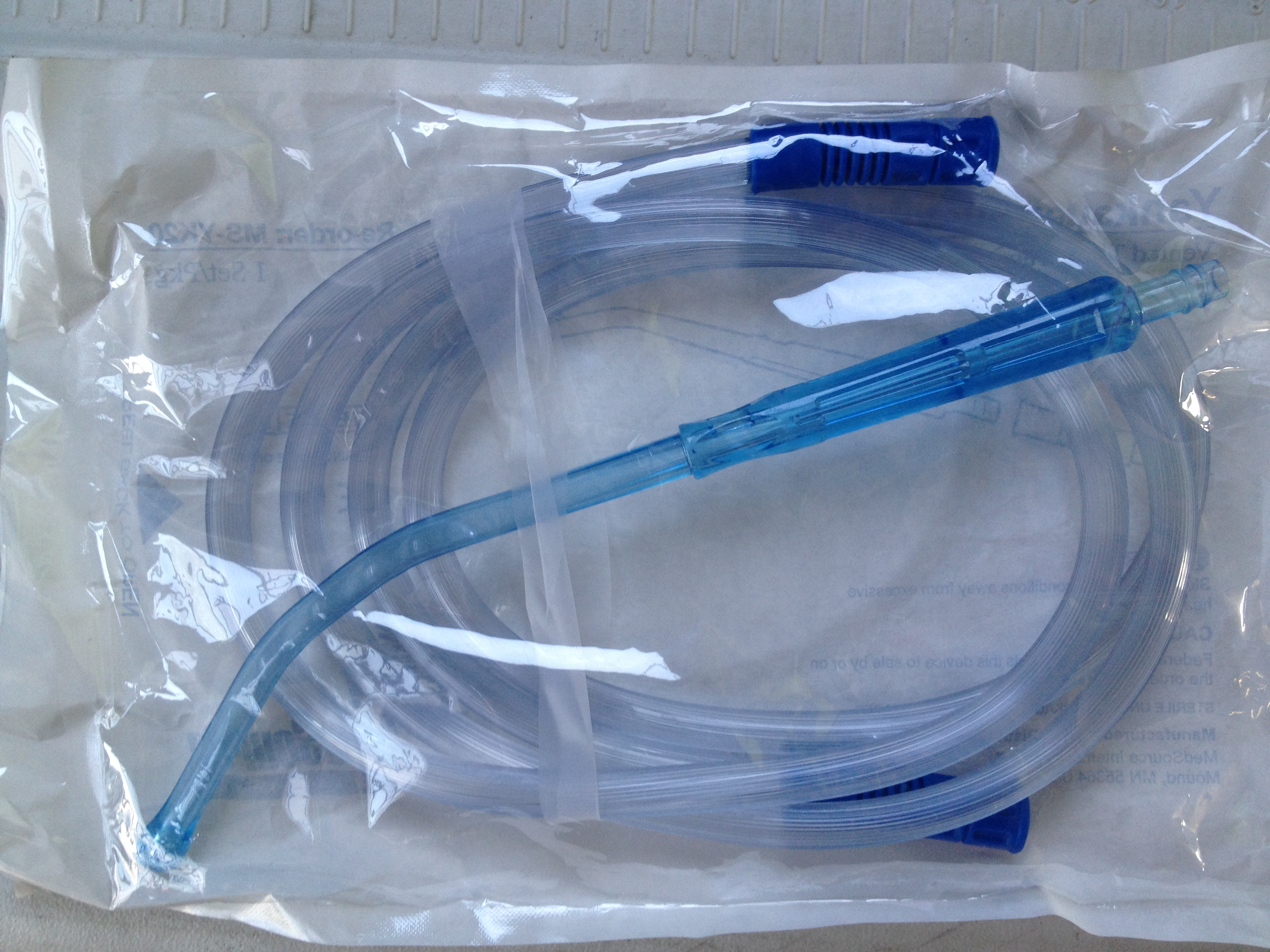
Yankauer suction tip

The Yankauer suction tip (/jæŋˈkaʊər/) is a suctioning tool used in medical procedures. It is typically a firm plastic suction tip with a large opening surrounded by a bulbous head and is designed to allow effective suction without damaging surrounding tissue. This tool is used to suction pharynx secretions in order to prevent aspiration. A Yankauer can also be used to clear operative sites during surgical procedures and its suctioned volume counted as blood loss during surgery.

The Yankauer suction tip is a rigid, curved plastic catheter with a bulbous head and one or more side holes, designed in 1907 by New York otolaryngologist Sidney Yankauer (1872–1932) to evacuate blood and secretions without damaging surrounding tissues. Although numerous proprietary variants exist, all retain the original wide-bore lumen and thumb-controlled vent that allow intermittent or continuous negative pressure during surgery or airway care. In modern operating theatres the device is the standard instrument for oropharyngeal suction, clearing the surgical field during head-and-neck, abdominal and obstetric procedures and reducing the risk of aspiration under anaesthesia.

In emergency medicine the traditional Yankauer remains ubiquitous, yet a recent review noted that its relatively narrow internal diameter can clog when faced with vomitus or thick blood; contemporary large-bore catheters such as the DuCanto have therefore been adopted for "suction-assisted laryngoscopy and airway decontamination" (SALAD) in high-contamination airways. Because of its long clinical track record and low cost, the Yankauer remains the standard benchmark in experimental assessments of suction-catheter flow rate and occlusion propensity.

Infection control guidelines classify Yankauer tips as single-patient, single-procedure items and recommend discarding them immediately after contamination or at the end of a case, because open suction catheters rapidly accumulate bacterial bioburden that can cause postoperative pneumonia or surgical-site infection.

Historically, the Yankauer suction tip supplanted the metal cannulae connected to foot-operated bellows that had limited earlier neurosurgical and otolaryngological procedures. Its widespread adoption paralleled the introduction of electrically powered wall suction and established the modern practice of combining irrigation with aspiration in the operative field. Design refinements over the twentieth century introduced moulded transparent plastics in the 1950s and optional integrated illumination in the 1990s. Despite these updates, the catheter's basic geometry has remained largely unchanged because the original dimensions already balanced visibility, durability and patient safety.

Despite criticisms, expert consensus still recommends the Yankauer for routine suctioning in controlled settings, reserving large-bore alternatives for anticipated high-volume contamination; this tiered approach, combined with strict single-use protocols, is widely regarded as the safest way to keep the airway open while reducing the risk of treatment-related problems.

== See also ==
- Instruments used in general surgery
