= Poynting effect =

The Poynting effect may refer to two unrelated physical phenomena. Neither should be confused with the Poynting–Robertson effect. All of these effects are named after John Henry Poynting, an English physicist.

== Solid mechanics ==
In solid mechanics, the Poynting effect is a finite strain theory effect observed when an elastic cube is sheared between two plates and stress is developed in the direction normal to the sheared faces, or when a cylinder is subjected to torsion and the axial length changes. The Poynting phenomenon in torsion was noticed experimentally by J. H. Poynting.

== Chemistry and thermodynamics ==
In thermodynamics, the Poynting effect generally refers to the change in the vapor pressure of a liquid substance when the total pressure of the liquid is varied. In particular this occurs when the vessel containing the vapor and liquid is pressurized by a non-condensable and non-soluble gas.

In 1881 Poynting generalized the Kelvin equation pointing out that vapor pressure was not only modified by Laplace pressure of curved surfaces, but in fact changes the same way due to any pressure source. In modern thermodynamics, this is understood as coming from the Maxwell relation for the chemical potential increase (of the liquid phase) due to pressure: $(\partial \mu/\partial P)_{T,N} = (\partial V/\partial N)_{T}$, i.e. $\mathrm d\mu = v_\text{liq} \mathrm dP_\text{liq}$ at constant temperature.

The fugacity shift from pressure is thus:

$$\frac{ f (T, P) }{f_\text{sat} (T)}  = \exp\left(\frac{ 1 }{ R T } \int_{P^\text{sat} (T)}^{P} v_\text{liq} \, dp \right)$$

where the exponential on the right is known as the Poynting factor.

If one assumes that the vapor is an ideal gas (fugacity = vapor pressure), and that the liquid is incompressible ($v_\text{liq}$ constant), then:

$$\frac{ p}{p_{\rm sat}}  = \exp\left(\frac{ v_\text{liq} }{ R T } ( P - p_{\rm sat} ) \right)$$

where

$p$ is the modified vapor pressure
$p_{\rm sat}$ is the vapor pressure as it would be with no other pressure sources applied
$v_{liq}$ is the liquid molar volume
$R$ is the molar gas constant
$T$ is the temperature
$P$ is the total pressure, i.e. the pressure of the liquid

For a 1 atmosphere pressure, room temperature, and typical liquid densities, the vapor pressure change from Poynting effect is less than 1%.

The Poynting effect assumes that the background pressure is supplied by an insoluble gas. If the gas is soluble, then it will also cause a decrease of the vapor pressure, a form of colligative effect that is caused by all solutes (and mathematically resembles the Poynting effect except with a negative 'pressure' equal to the osmotic pressure). This decrease may cancel or even overwhelm the small increase from the Poynting effect, depending on the solubility.

A commonly cited example is the production of the medicine Entonox, a high-pressure mixture of nitrous oxide and oxygen. The ability to combine N_{2}O and O_{2} at high pressure while remaining in the gaseous form is attributed to the oxygen exerting a Poynting effect on the nitrous oxide, though in fact the effect at play is slightly distinct and involves a shift in the critical point (also called Poynting effect).
