= John Henry Poynting =

English physicist (1852–1914)

John Poynting
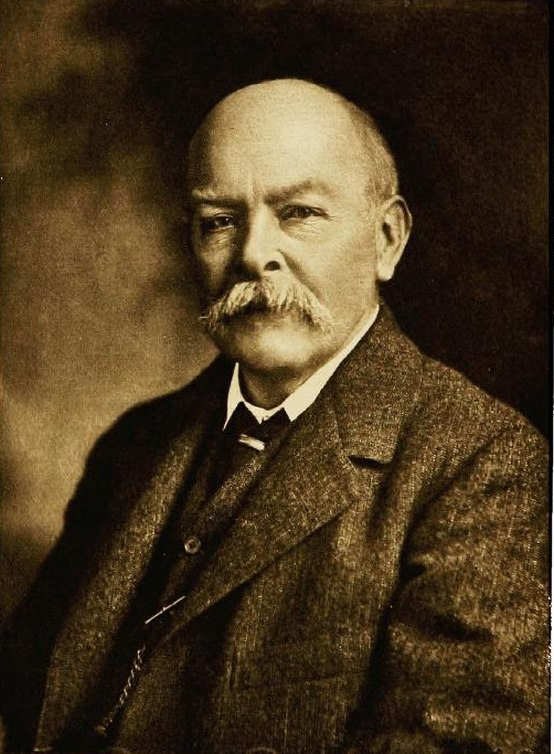
- John Henry Poynting
- Born: 9 September 1852; Monton, Lancashire, England
- Died: 30 March 1914 (aged 61); Birmingham, England
- Education: University of Cambridge; Owens College (now University of Manchester)
- Known for: Poynting vector Poynting effect Poynting's theorem Poynting–Robertson effect Term "Greenhouse Effect"; Calculating the mass of the Earth
- Awards: Adams Prize (1893); Hopkins Prize (1893); Royal Medal (1905)
- Scientific career
- Fields: Physicist
- Workplaces: Mason Science College, University of Birmingham
- Academic advisors: James Clerk Maxwell
- Notable students: Francis William Aston; Alfred J. Lotka

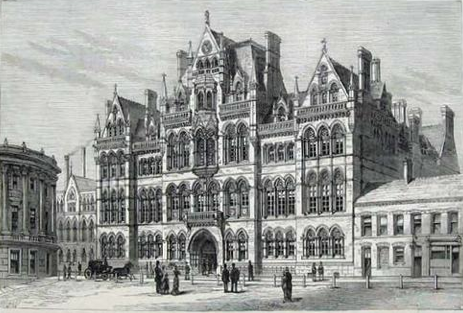
Mason Science College (demolished in 1964)

John Henry Poynting FRS (9 September 1852 – 30 March 1914) was an English physicist. He was the first professor of physics at Mason Science College from 1880 to 1900, and then the successor institution, the University of Birmingham until his death.

== Early life and education ==
Poynting was the youngest son of Thomas Elford Poynting, a Unitarian minister. He was born at the parsonage of the Monton Unitarian Chapel in Eccles, Lancashire, where his father served as minister from 1846 to 1878. In his boyhood, he was educated at the nearby school operated by his father. From 1867 to 1872, he attended Owens College, now the University of Manchester, where his physics teachers included Osborne Reynolds and Balfour Stewart. From 1872 to 1876 he was a student at the University of Cambridge, where he attained high honours in mathematics after taking grinds with Edward Routh.

== Career ==
In the late 1870s, he worked in the Cavendish Laboratory at Cambridge under James Clerk Maxwell. In 1880, he became the first professor of physics at the University of Birmingham. He was the developer and eponym of the Poynting vector, which describes the direction and magnitude of electromagnetic energy flow and is used in the Poynting theorem, a statement about energy conservation for electric and magnetic fields. This work was first published in 1884. He performed a measurement of Newton's gravitational constant by innovative means during 1893. In 1903, he was the first to realise that the Sun's radiation can draw in small particles towards it: this was later named the Poynting–Robertson effect.

He discovered the torsion-extension coupling in finite strain elasticity. This is now known as the (positive) Poynting effect in torsion.

Poynting and the Nobel prizewinner J. J. Thomson co-authored a multi-volume undergraduate physics textbook, which was in print for about 50 years and was in widespread use during the first third of the 20th century. Poynting wrote most of it.

He was awarded an honorary MSc in Pure Science in 1901 by Birmingham University.

== Personal life ==
Poynting lived at 11 St Augustine's Road, Edgbaston with his family and servants for some years. He previously lived at 66 Beaufort Road, Edgbaston (demolished) and died of a diabetic coma, aged 61, at 10 Ampton Road, Edgbaston in 1914. In 1880, he married Maria Adney Cropper. He was survived by his widow, a son, and two daughters.

== Legacy ==
Alfred J. Lotka was among Poynting's most famous students, being inspired by Poynting to apply the ideas of physical chemistry to biology. Lotka dedicated his classic book on mathematical population biology to Poynting. Poynting predicted the 'Poynting-Robertson effect', whereby a particle of dust orbiting a star experiences a drag force which makes it spiral slowly into the star. Howard P. Robertson later restated the prediction using general relativity. Poynting also founded and is the namesake of the popular student society at the University of Birmingham, 'The Poynting Physical Society' or PPS.

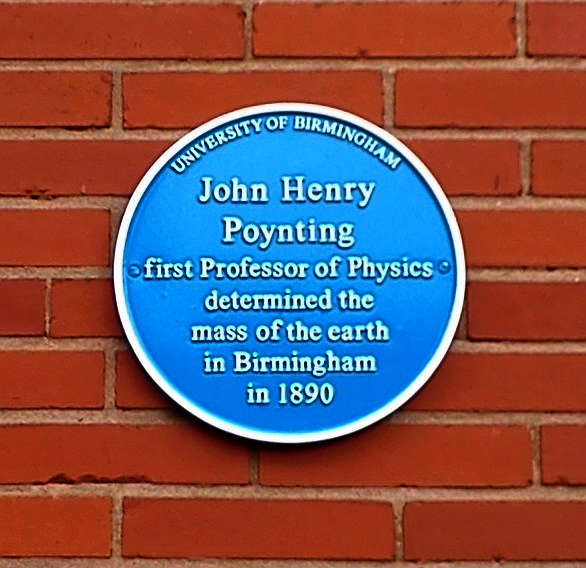
University of Birmingham – Poynting Physics Building – blue plaque

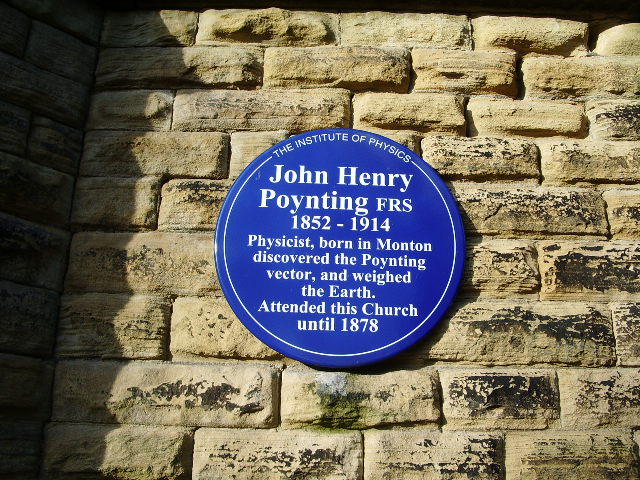
Blue plaque to Poynting erected in Salford by the Institute of Physics

Craters on Mars and the Moon are named in his honour, as is the main physics building at the University of Birmingham and the departmental society there, the Poynting Physical Society. He is credited with coining the expression "greenhouse effect" in 1909 to explain how infrared-absorbing trace gasses such as carbon dioxide in the atmosphere increases the surface temperature of Earth and Mars.

== Works by J. H. Poynting ==
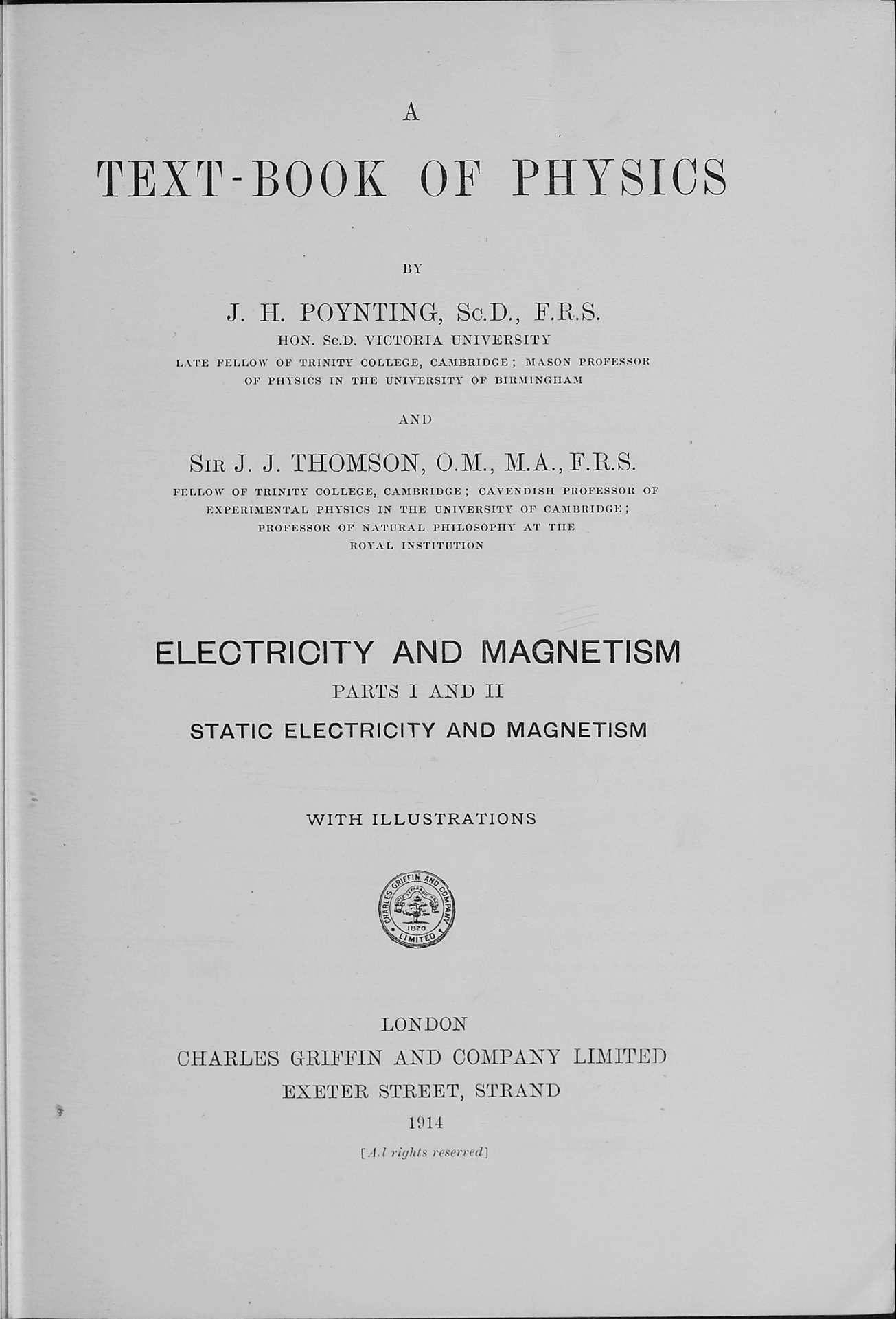
Electricity and magnetism, 1914

- 1884 A Comparison of the Fluctuations in the Price of Wheat and in the Cotton and Silk Imports into Great Britain, Journal of the Royal Statistical Society; 47, 1884, pp. 34–64
- 1894 The Mean Density of the Earth London, C. Griffin
- 1899 (with J. J. Thomson) A Text-Book of Physics: volume I: Sound London, C. Griffin; 2nd edition, 1900
- 1902 (with J. J. Thomson) A Text-Book of Physics: volume II: Properties of Matter London, C. Griffin
- 1904 (with J. J. Thomson) A Text-Book of Physics: volume III: Heat London, C. Griffin
- 1913 The earth; its shape, size, weight and spin Cambridge University Press
- 1914 (with J. J. Thomson) A Text-Book of Physics: volume IV: Electricity and Magnetism. Pts. I and II: Static electricity and magnetism London, C. Griffin
- 1920 Collected Scientific Papers Cambridge University Press
