= Suction (medicine) =

Method for the removal of fluids

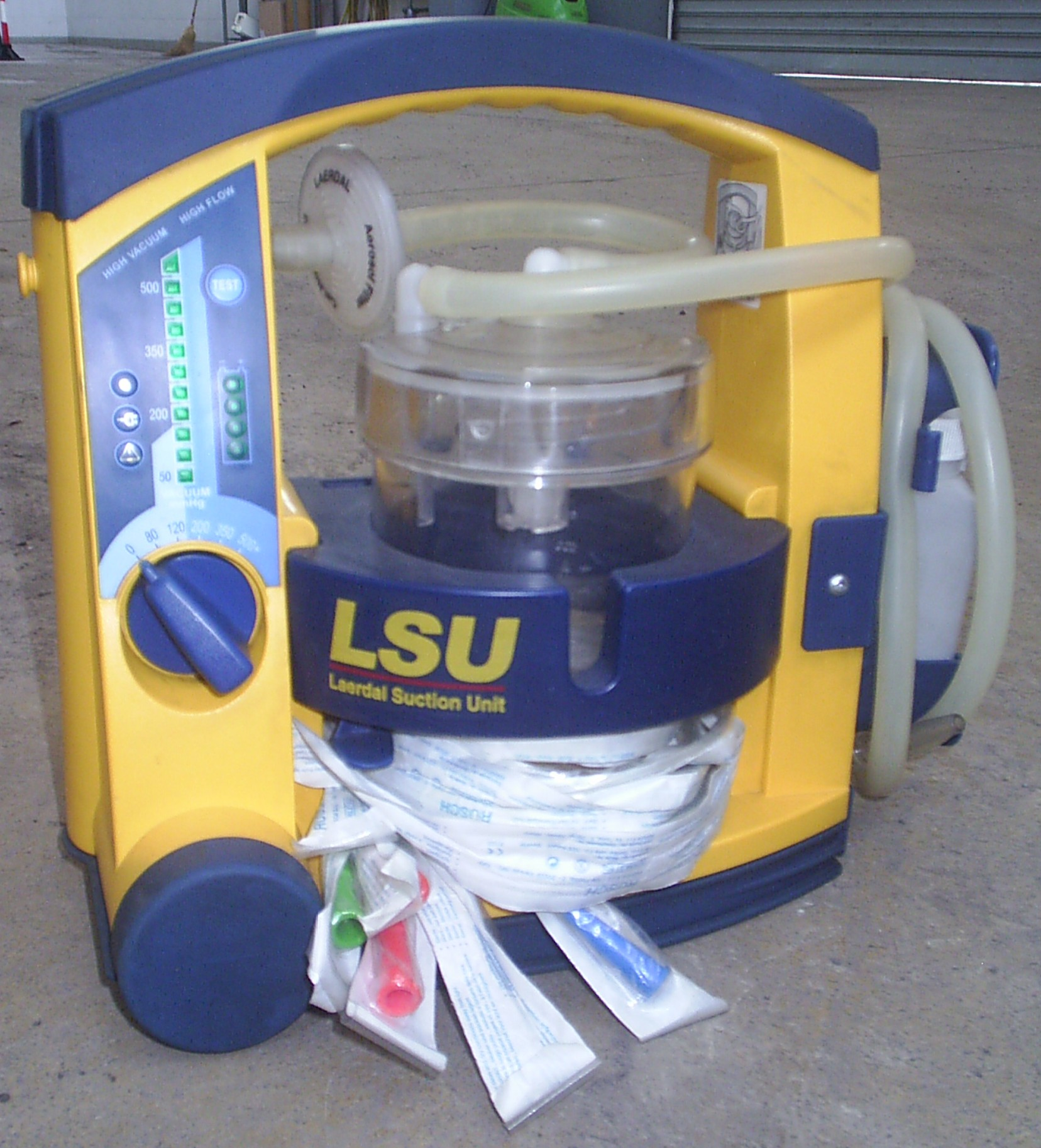
The portable suction unit of an ambulance

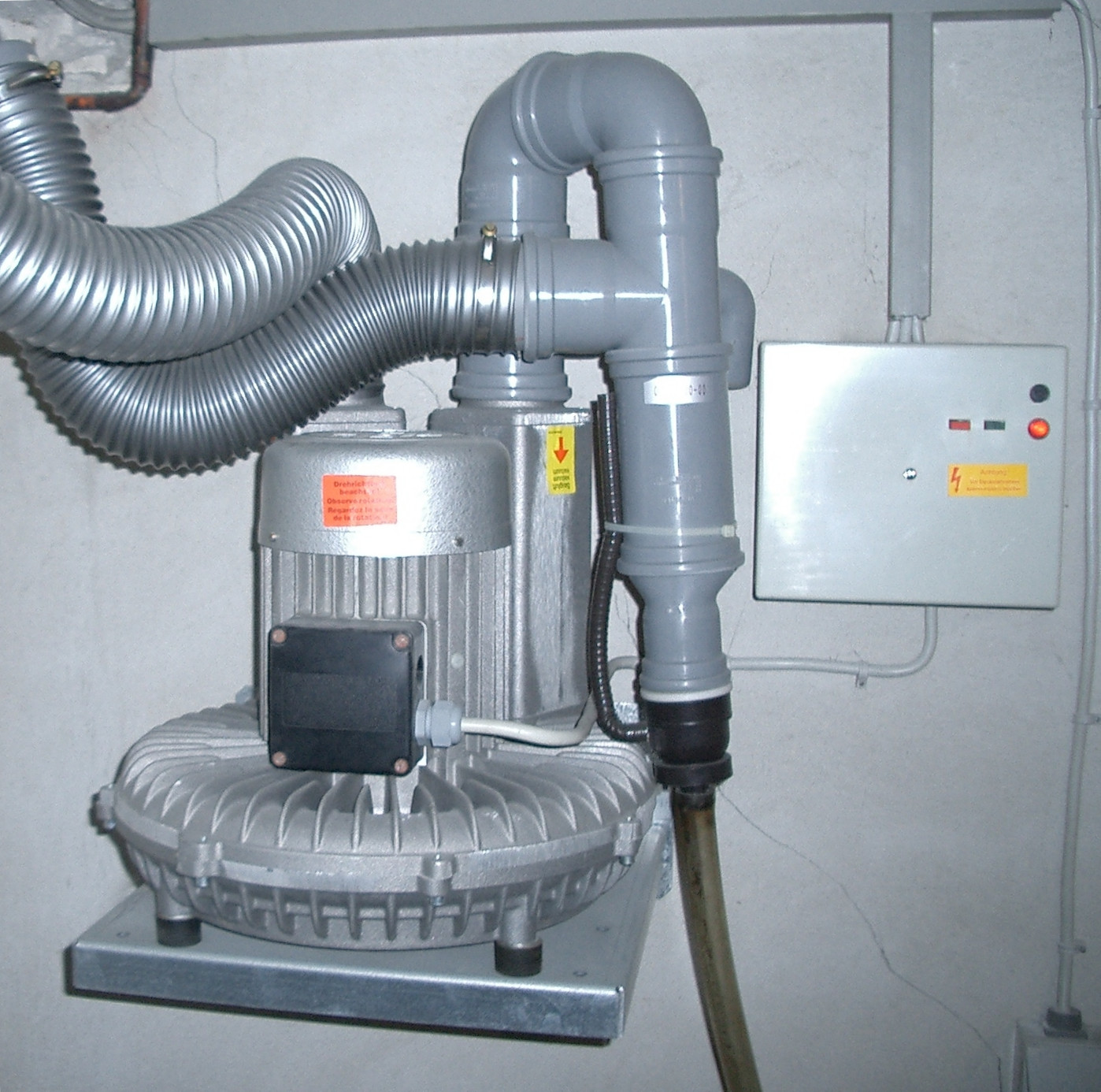
A dental vacuum system for central suction

In medicine, devices are sometimes necessary to create suction. Suction may be used to clear the airway of blood, saliva, vomit, or other secretions so that a patient may breathe. Suctioning can prevent pulmonary aspiration, which can lead to lung infections. In pulmonary hygiene, suction is used to remove fluids from the airways, to facilitate breathing and prevent growth of microorganisms. Small suction-providing devices are often called aspirators.

In surgery suction can be used to remove blood from the area being operated on to allow surgeons to view and work on the area. Suction may also be used to remove blood that has built up within the skull after an intracranial hemorrhage.

Suction devices may be mechanical hand pumps or battery or electrically operated mechanisms. In many hospitals and other health facilities, suction is typically provided by suction regulators, connected to a central medical vacuum supply by way of a pipeline system. The plastic, rigid Yankauer suction tip is one type of tip that may be attached to a suction device. Another is the plastic, nonrigid French or whistle tip catheter.

== See also ==
- Aspirator (medical device)
- Dental suction
