= Mechanical power (medicine) =

Medical term

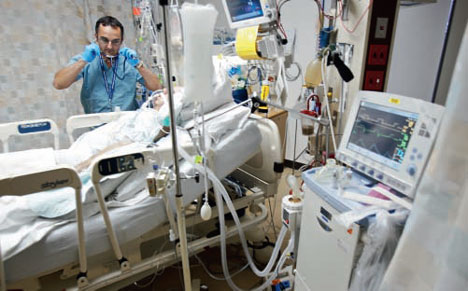
Respiratory therapist examining a mechanically ventilated patient on an intensive care unit. The more time a patient spends exposed to the forces applied to them by a mechanical ventilator, the higher the risk of suffering a ventilator-associated lung injury.

In medicine, mechanical power is a measure of the amount of energy imparted to a patient by a mechanical ventilator.

== Mechanical ventilation ==
While in many cases mechanical ventilation is a life-saving or life-preserving intervention, it also has the potential to cause harm to the patient via ventilator-associated lung injury. A number of stresses may be induced by the ventilator on the patient's lung. These include barotrauma caused by pressure, volutrauma caused by distension of the lungs, rheotrauma caused by fast-flowing delivery of gases and atelectotrauma resulting from repeated collapse and re-opening of the lung.

The purpose of mechanical power is to provide a quantity which can account for all of these stresses and therefore predict the amount of lung injury which is likely to be seen in the patient.
