= Atelectotrauma =

Damage caused to the lung by mechanical ventilation

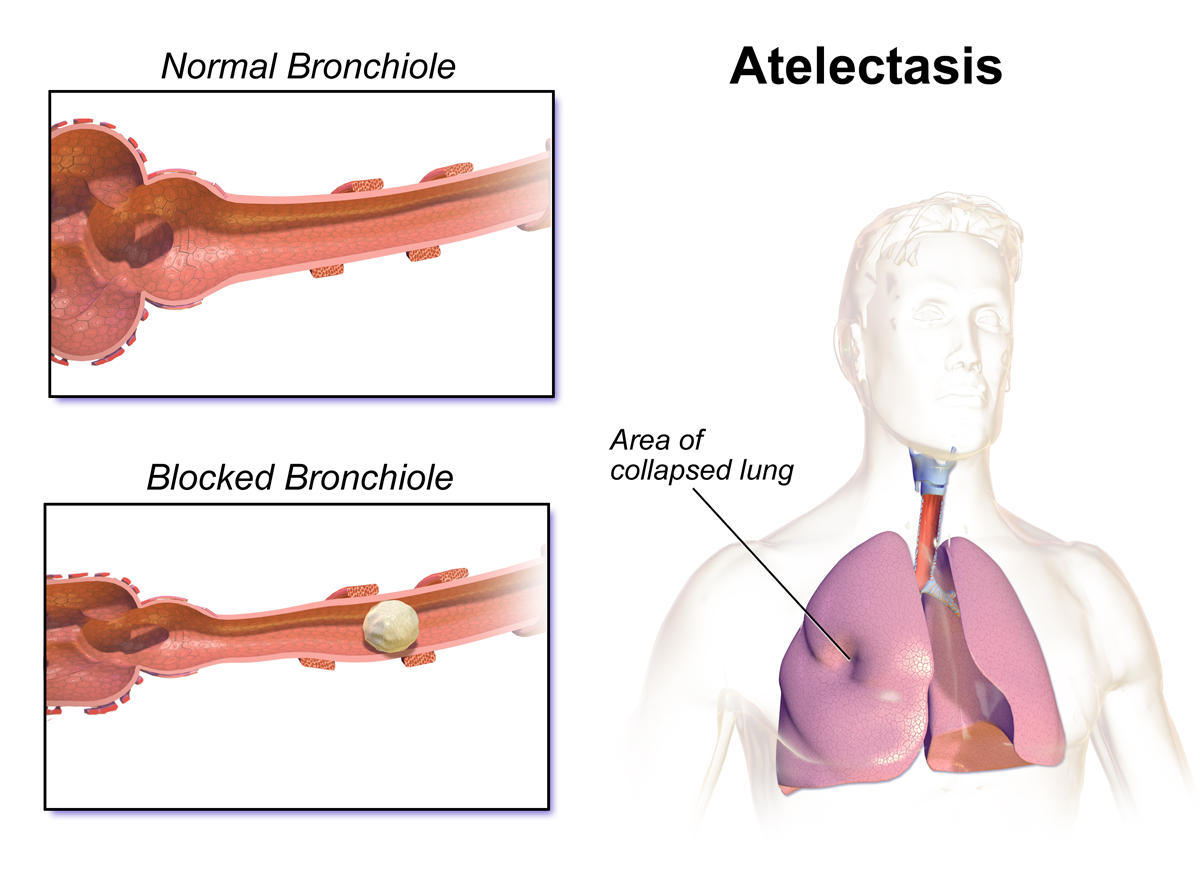
Atelectasis occurs when distending pressure of the alveolus is overcome by surface tension of fluid within the alveolus. Repeated atelectasis and re-inflation leads to atelectotrauma.

In medicine, atelectotrauma, atelectrauma, cyclic atelectasis or repeated alveolar collapse and expansion (RACE) is the damage caused to the lung by mechanical ventilation under certain conditions.

== Disorder ==
When parts of the lung collapse at the end of expiration, due to a combination of a diseased lung state and a low functional residual capacity, then reopen again on inspiration, this repeated collapsing and reopening causes shear stress which has a damaging effect on the alveolus. Clinicians attempt to reduce atelectotrauma by ensuring adequate positive end-expiratory pressure (PEEP) to maintain the alveoli open in expiration. This is known as open lung ventilation. High-frequency oscillatory ventilation (HFOV) with its use of super continuous positive airway pressure (CPAP) is especially effective in preventing atelectotrauma since it maintains a very high mean airway pressure (MAP), equivalent to a very high PEEP. Atelectotrauma is one of several means by which mechanical ventilation may damage the lungs leading to ventilator-associated lung injury. The other means are volutrauma, barotrauma, rheotrauma and biotrauma. Attempts have been made to combine these factors in an all encompassing term: mechanical power.
