= RSBI =

RSBI may refer to:

- Radiographic supporting bone index
- Rapid shallow breathing index
