= Rheotrauma =

Complication of mechanical ventilation

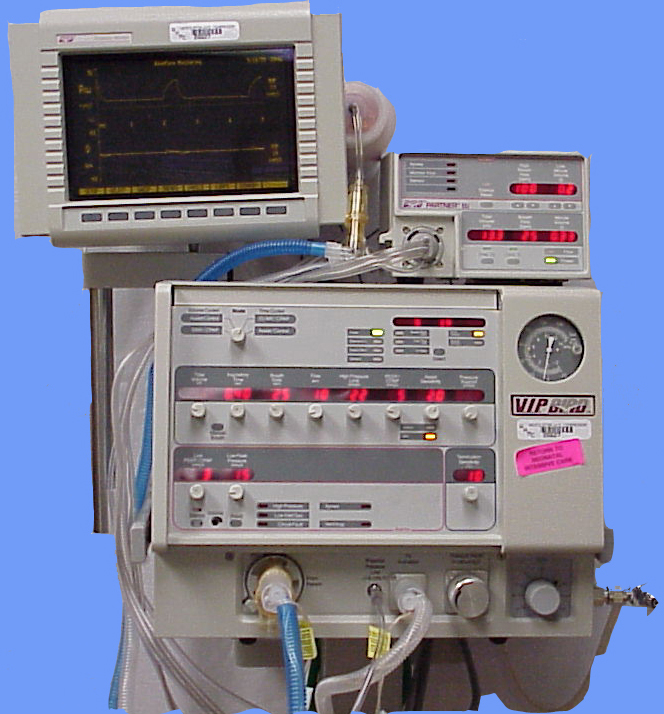
A neonatal mechanical ventilator. High gas flows are often used in neonatal ventilation which carries the risk of rheotrauma.

In medicine, rheotrauma is the harm caused to a patient's lungs by high gas flows as delivered by mechanical ventilation. Although mechanical ventilation may prevent death of a patient from the hypoxia or hypercarbia which may be caused by respiratory failure, it can also be damaging to the lungs, leading to ventilator-associated lung injury. Rheotrauma is one of the ways in which mechanical ventilation may do this, alongside volutrauma, barotrauma, atelectotrauma and biotrauma. Attempts have been made to combine all of the mechanical forces caused by the ventilator on the patient's lungs in an all encompassing term: mechanical power.
