= Barosinusitis =

Barotrauma of the sinuses

- Other names: Aerosinusitis, sinus squeeze, sinus barotrauma
- Paranasal sinuses.
- Specialty: Emergency medicine, diving medicine
- Treatment: medicine

Barosinusitis, also called aerosinusitis, sinus squeeze or sinus barotrauma is a painful inflammation and sometimes bleeding of the membrane of the paranasal sinus cavities, normally the frontal sinus. It is caused by a difference in air pressures inside and outside the cavities.

== Presentation ==
Typically, sinus barotrauma is preceded by an upper respiratory tract infection or allergy. The affected person has a sudden sharp facial pain or headache during descent, which increases as the aircraft approaches ground level. The pain can ultimately become disabling unless the ambient pressure is reversed.

The pressure difference causes the mucosal lining of the sinuses to become swollen and submucosal bleeding follows with further difficulties ventilating the sinus, especially if the orifices are involved. Ultimately fluid or blood will fill the space.

In most cases of sinus barotrauma, localized pain to the frontal area is the predominant symptom. This is due to pain originating from the frontal sinus, it being above the brow bones. Less common is pain referred to the temporal, occipital, or retrobulbar region. Epistaxis or serosanguineous secretion from the nose may occur. Neurological symptoms may affect the adjacent fifth cranial nerve and especially the infraorbital nerve.

== Pathology ==
The pathology of sinus barotrauma is directly related to Boyle's law, which states that the volume of a gas is inversely proportional to the pressure on it, when temperature is constant (P1 × V1 = P2 × V2). Two types of acute barotrauma are observed: squeeze and reverse squeeze.

On ascent, the air in the paranasal sinuses will expand according to Boyle's law, contracting during descent. Normally, the sinuses drain into the nasal cavity through small ostia, which permit mucociliary clearance and ventilation that equilibrates pressure. However, when the opening is obstructed due to inflammation, polyps, mucosal thickening, anatomical abnormalities, or other lesions, pressure equilibration is impossible. Squeeze is produced on descent when trapped air in the sinuses contracts and produces negative pressure. The pressure differentials are directed to the center of the sinuses producing mucosal edema, transudation, and mucosal-or submucosal-hematoma, leading to further occlusion of the sinus ostium. The sinus will fill with fluid or blood unless the pressure differential is neutralized.

If the outlet is blocked during ascent, the situation is reversed and "reverse squeeze" appears. Pressure inside the sinus increases, affecting the walls of the sinus and producing pain or epistaxis.

== Location ==
The majority of episodes of sinus barotrauma occur in the frontal sinuses with pain localized over the frontal area. Possible explanations for this might be the relatively long and delicate nasofrontal duct that connects the narrow frontal recess with the frontal sinuses.

Barotrauma located in the maxillary, ethmoidal, or sphenoid sinuses is observed less frequently and appears when the ostia are blocked; the majority of cases are probably caused by an acute upper respiratory tract infection. The magnitude of the pressure difference needed to produce a barotrauma probably shows great individual variation and is related to the size of the sinus ostium and the rate of ambient pressure change. Due to this, even commercial flying may produce severe cases of barotraumas, although most of the cases are observed in high performance aircraft with lower pressurized cabins.

== Diagnosis ==
Most cases occur in scuba divers and fliers, and is easily diagnosed when presented to physicians immediately after exposure. On the other hand, the problem may remain undiagnosed when the history fails to relate the symptoms to exposure to environmental pressure changes or if the focus is on other etiologies.

=== Grades ===
Weissman defined three grades of sinus barotraumas according to symptomatology.

- Grade I includes cases with mild transient sinus discomfort without changes visible on X-ray.
- Grade II is characterized by severe pain for up to 24 h, with some mucosal thickening on X-ray.
- Patients with grade III have severe pain lasting for more than 24 h and X-ray shows severe mucosal thickening or opacification of the affected sinus; epistaxis or subsequent sinusitis may be observed.

== Treatment ==
Mild cases of barotrauma are readily treated by topical decongestants and painkillers. In severe cases or cases resistant to local treatment, functional endoscopic sinus surgery is indicated in order to re-establish drainage and ventilation of the sinuses. This treatment has shown good results in aviators who have recurrent sinus barotrauma. Computer-aided surgery has re-established the drainage of affected sinuses, especially with regard to the sphenoid sinuses. When the sphenoids were entered endoscopically, mucosal petechia and hematoma were clearly seen.

== History ==
Sinus barotrauma or aerosinusitis has been known since the early development of aviation medicine. However, it was during World War II that the subject first received serious attention and the pathogenesis of the disease was understood to be due to exposure to high altitude flights. Rapid altitude changes with accompanying changes in ambient pressure exposed the aircrews to an increasing number of episodes of sinus barotrauma.

Referred pain from barosinusitis to the maxilla consists about one-fifth of in-flight barodontalgia (i.e., pain in the oral cavity caused by barometric pressure change) cases. Although the environment of fighter pilots produces the most stressful barometric changes, commercial flying has changed the picture of the disease.

== See also ==
- Barodontalgia – Tooth pain caused by ambient pressure change
- Barotrauma – Injury due to pressure difference between gas filled space and adjoining tissue
