= John Scott Inkster =

British anesthesiologist

John Scott Inkster (12 August 1924 – 10 September 2011) was a British anesthesiologist who was one of the first paediatric anaesthetists. He graduated from the University of Aberdeen in 1945. Inkster's interest in anesthesia started during his time as a house physician at New End Hospital. He discovered positive end-expiratory pressure.

John Inkster died on 10 September 2011.
