= Positive end-expiratory pressure =

Pressure in the lungs above atmospheric pressure

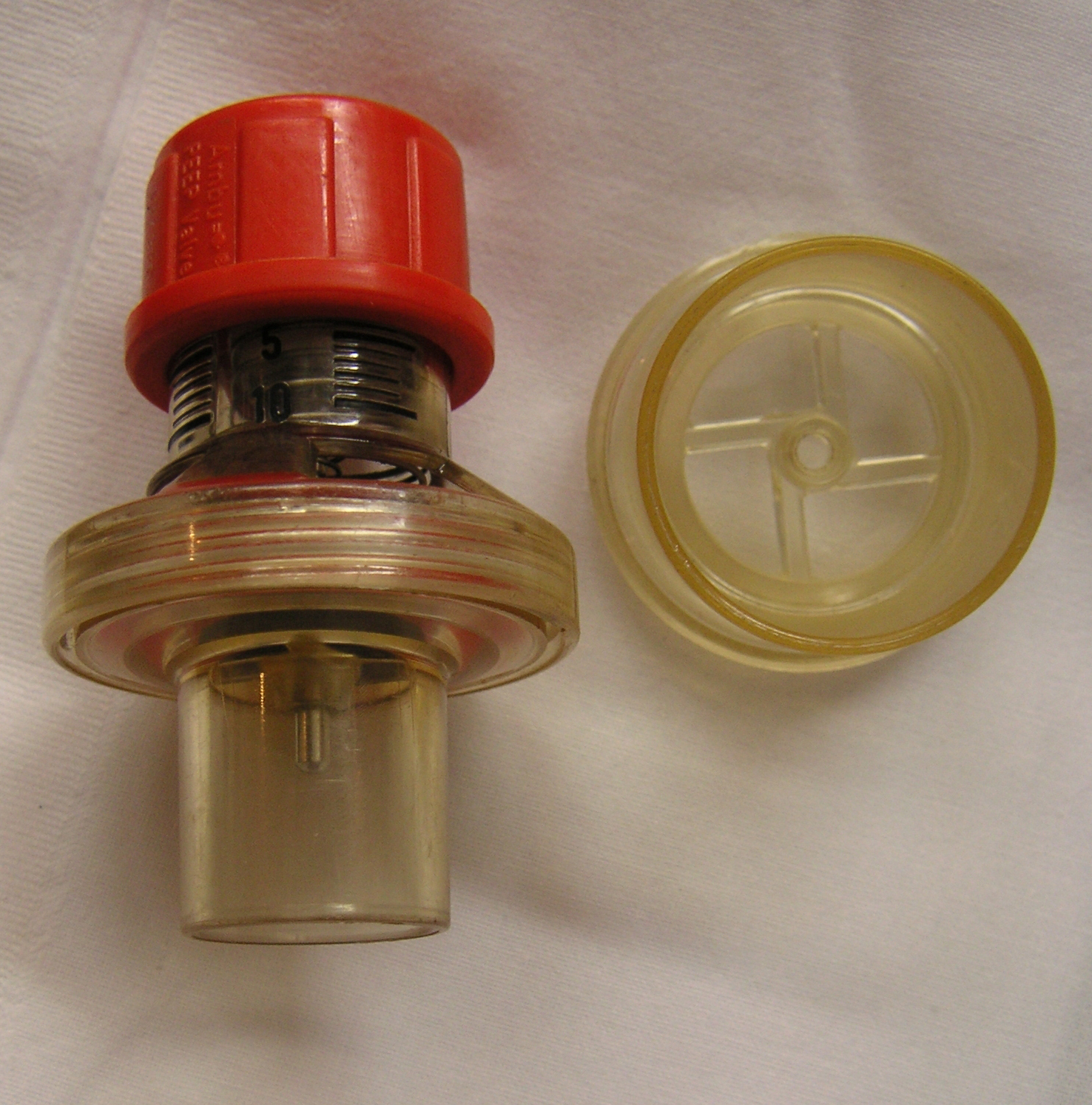
A PEEP valve

Positive end-expiratory pressure (PEEP) is the pressure in the lungs (alveolar pressure) above atmospheric pressure (the pressure outside of the body) that exists at the end of expiration. The two types of PEEP are extrinsic PEEP (applied by a ventilator) and intrinsic PEEP (caused by an incomplete exhalation). Pressure that is applied or increased during an inspiration is termed pressure support. PEEP is a therapeutic parameter set in the ventilator (extrinsic PEEP), or a complication of mechanical ventilation with air trapping (auto-PEEP).

== Intrinsic (auto-) PEEP ==
Auto-PEEP is an incomplete expiration prior to the initiation of the next breath causes progressive air trapping (hyperinflation). This accumulation of air increases alveolar pressure at the end of expiration, which is referred to as auto-PEEP.

Auto-PEEP develops commonly in high minute ventilation (hyperventilation), expiratory flow limitation (obstructed airway) and expiratory resistance (narrow airway).

Once auto-PEEP is identified, steps should be taken to stop or reduce the pressure build-up. When auto-PEEP persists despite management of its underlying cause, applied PEEP may be helpful if the patient has an expiratory flow limitation (obstruction).

== Extrinsic (applied) PEEP ==
Applied PEEP is usually one of the first ventilator settings chosen when mechanical ventilation is initiated. It is set directly on the ventilator.

A small amount of applied PEEP (4 to 5 cmH_{2}O) is used in most mechanically ventilated patients to mitigate end-expiratory alveolar collapse. A higher level of applied PEEP (>5 cmH_{2}O) is sometimes used to improve hypoxemia or reduce ventilator-associated lung injury in patients with acute lung injury, acute respiratory distress syndrome, or other types of hypoxemic respiratory failure.

=== Complications and effects ===
Positive end-expiratory pressure can contribute to:

- Decrease in
  - systemic venous return, cardiac output, cardiac index
  - pulmonary capillary wedge pressure (PCWP), preload, arterial blood pressure
- Increase in:
  - Intrathoracic pressure, RV afterload (CVP and PAP)
  - lung functional residual capacity
- Pulmonary barotrauma can be caused. Pulmonary barotrauma is lung injury that results from the hyperinflation of alveoli past the rupture point.
- The effects of PEEP on intracranial pressure (ICP) have been studied. Although PEEP is hypothesized to increase ICP due to impedance of cerebral blood flow, it has been shown that high PEEP does not increase ICP.
- Renal functions and electrolyte imbalances, due to decreased venous return metabolism of certain drugs are altered and acid-base balance is impeded.

== History ==
John Scott Inkster, an English anaesthetist and physician, is credited with discovering PEEP. When his discovery was published in the proceedings of the World Congress of Anaesthesia in 1968, Inkster called it Residual Positive Pressure.

== See also ==
- Continuous positive airway pressure – Ventilator which applies mild air pressure continuously to keep airways open (CPAP)
- Positive airway pressure – Mechanical ventilation in which airway pressure is always above atmospheric pressure
