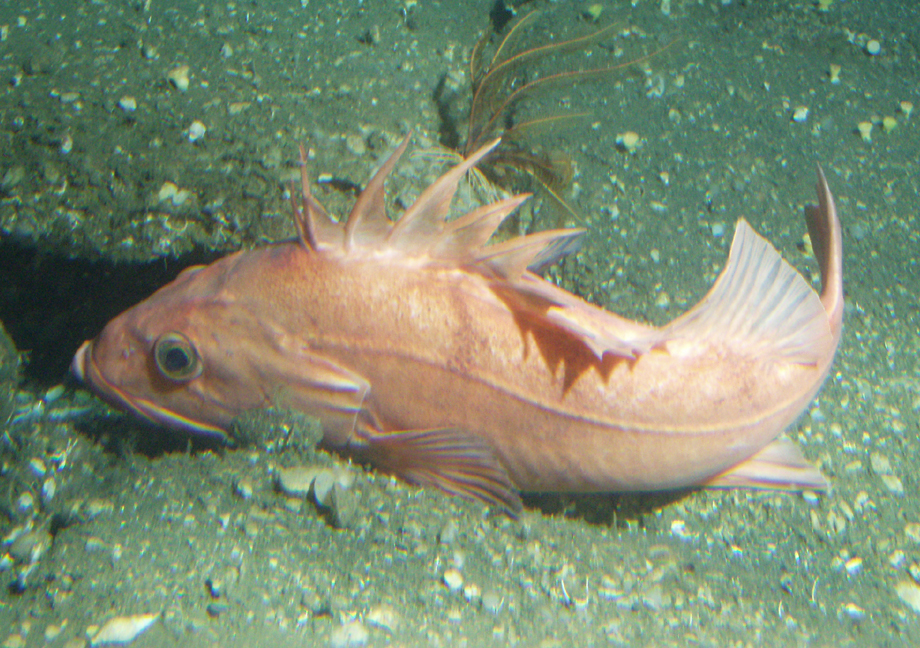

Scientific classification
- Kingdom: Animalia
- Phylum: Chordata
- Class: Actinopterygii
- Order: Perciformes
- Family: Scorpaenidae
- Genus: Sebastes
- Species: S. levis

Binomial name
- Sebastes levis (C. H. Eigenmann & R. S. Eigenmann, 1889)

Synonyms
- Sebastichthys levis Eigenmann & Eigenmann, 1889

= Sebastes levis =

Species of fish

Sebastes levis, the cowcod or cow rockfish, is a species of marine ray-finned fish belonging to the subfamily Sebastinae, the rockfishes, part of the family Scorpaenidae. It is found in the Eastern Pacific Ocean.

== Taxonomy and etymology ==
Sebastes levis was first was first formally described in 1878 by the American ichthyologists Carl H. Eigenmann and Rosa Smith Eigenmann with the type locality given as the Cortes Bank off San Diego, California. Some authorities classify this species in the subgenus Hispaniscus. The specific name levis means "light" or "mild." The Eigenmanns did not explain this allusion, but it may refer to the pink, occasionally, pale-orange color of adults, i.e not red. Alternatively, as suggested by Jordan and Evermann in 1898, the name may mean "capricious or fantastic," this suggestion was not explained but may refer to the rapid color changes this species can perform.

== Description ==
Sebastes levis has a deep and compressed body, the body's depth is between a third and two fifths of its standard length. They have a large head, small eyes and a large mouth with a lower jaw which juts out. The head is armed with many spines. There are 13 to 14 spines and 12 to 13 soft rays in the dorsal fin and 3 spines and 6 or 7 soft rays in the anal fin. The membranes of the dorsal fin are deeply incised, especially compared to other fish in the Sebastes genus.

This species grows to a maximum fork length of 100 cm (39 in), and a max size of at least 13.6 kg (30 lb), making them one of the larger species of rockfish.

Adult cowcod are variable in color and may be cream, pink, salmon, orange or gold. Some may have indistinct dark or red barring. The juveniles are marked with gold or brown bars on a background color of whitish or pale yellow. The juveniles are very similar to the barred juveniles of some other species of rockfish.

== Distribution and habitat ==
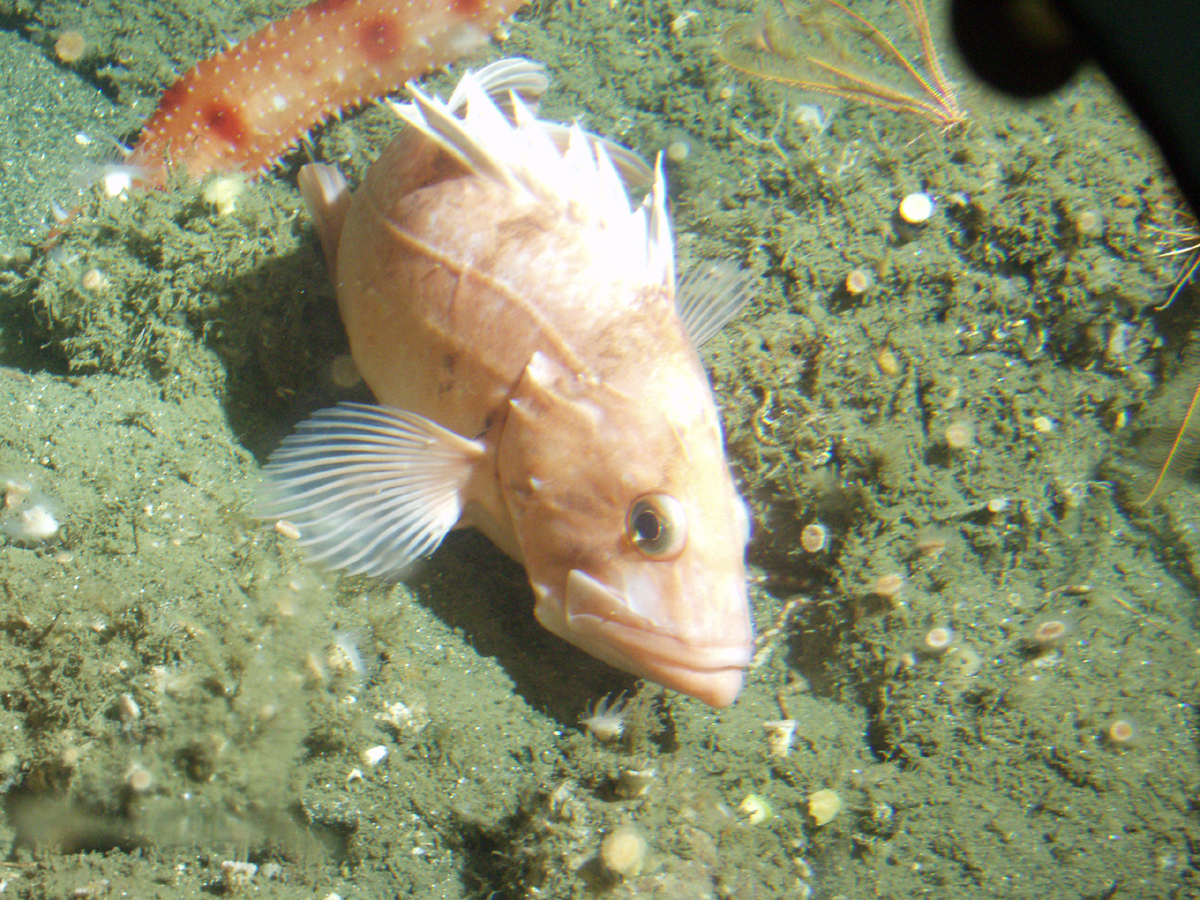
A cowcod resting on a reef

Sebastes levis is found in the Eastern Pacific Ocean where it occurs from Guerrero Negro in Baja California Sur north to Usal, Mendocino County in central California. Adults, with total lengths greater than 44 cm (17 in), are found on rocky substrates at depths of 90 to 300 m (300 to 980 ft), while the juveniles live in areas of fine sand and clay at depths between 40 and 100 m (130 and 330 ft). It is a demersal fish and has also been found sheltering over rock structures, rocky reefs, at the base of man-made structures and within kelp forests at depths as deep as 515 m (1,690 ft).

== Biology and ecology ==
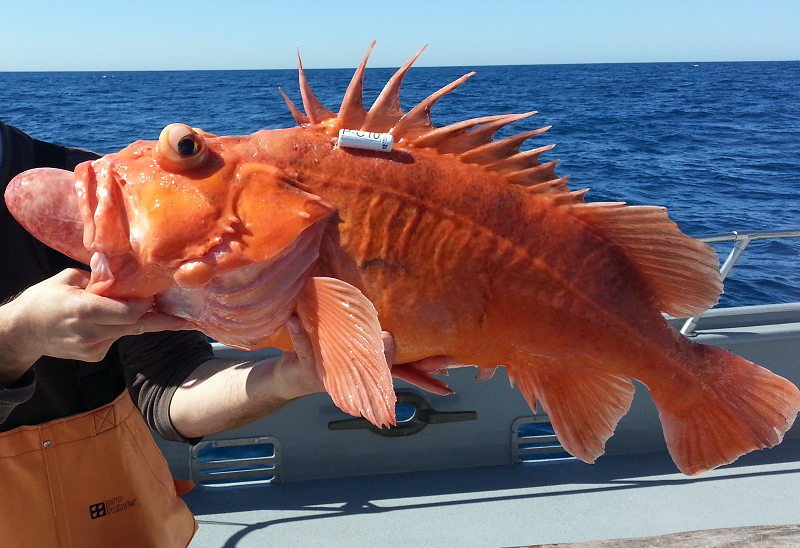
A large cowcod experiencing barotrauma, or decompression, after being brought to the surface from depths. The fish also has a recently attached transmitter for scientific study. Courtesy of NOAA Fisheries [https://www.fisheries.noaa.gov/west-coast/recreational-fishing/rockfish-barotrauma-and-recompression

Sebastes levis is an ambush predator in the deep waters over the continental shelf and upper slope, their prey mainly consisting of benthic crabs, octopus, shrimp, and small fish. They are solitary and territorial as adults. This species, as in other rockfishes, are long lived, living at least as long as 55 years. The females attain sexually maturity around 16 years old when they reach a length of 50 cm (20 in) whereas the males become mature at 14 years old when they have reached a length of 47.5 cm (18.7 in). The females produce eggs in their ovaries from November to May, the larger individuals are able to produce as many as 1,925,000 eggs in a season. Like other rockfish, they are primitively viviparous, and give live birth. The eggs are fertilized internally and small pelagic larvae are born which settle when they are 100 days old and 5 cm (2.0 in) in length.

== Conservation ==
Overfishing of cowcod in the 1970s and 1980s is estimated to have led to a steep decline in abundance to a low point of 9% of unfished biomass in 1989. The stock was declared overfished in 2000 and retention of cowcod was prohibited from January 2001 until January 2011. From 2011 onward, a small quota was allocated to the trawl fishery but retention remained prohibited in all other sectors. The initial rebuilding plan estimated that the recovery would take decades, but a stock assessment conducted in 2019 estimated the stock had recovered to 57% of the unfished biomass and the stock was declared to have been rebuilt.

The California Department of Fish and Wildlife closed 4,300 square nautical miles (5,700 sq mi; 15,000 km^{2}) off Southern California to all bottomfishing as a cowcod conservation area (CCAs,) and prohibited all cowcod catch. As of January 2024, these zones have been redesignated Groundfish Exclusion Areas (GEAs,) acting as a marine protected area, which prevent the targeting of all groundfish species within the zones. The new GEAs cover around 11.8% of the previous CCAs, although a trawling ban still persists across the previously designated CCA zones.
