= Martin J. Tobin =

Irish pulmonologist (born 1951)

Martin Tobin
- Born: Martin John Tobin; 23 April 1951 (age 75); Freshford, County Kilkenny, Ireland
- Education: University College Dublin
- Occupation: Physician
- Organization(s): Loyola University Medical Center, Edward Hines Jr. Veterans Administration Hospital

Martin John Tobin (born 23 April 1951) is an Irish-American critical care physician, pulmonologist, and academic who is a recognised expert in acute respiratory failure, mechanical ventilation, and neuromuscular control of breathing.

According to the American Thoracic Society, Tobin is "the supreme scholar of critical care medicine and editor or author of seven extraordinary textbooks on the subject." The Lancet described his textbook Principles And Practice of Mechanical Ventilation as the "Bible" of the field of mechanical ventilation. He was elected to the American Society for Clinical Investigation in 1994 and was editor of the American Journal of Respiratory and Critical Care Medicine from 1999–2004.

== Education and career ==
Tobin was born in Freshford, County Kilkenny, and attended medical school at University College Dublin from 1969 to 1975, where he earned a MB BCh BAO. He earned a British Thoracic Association Research Fellowship at King's College Hospital, London with Philip Hugh-Jones. He was a pulmonary fellow in the Division of Pulmonary Medicine at the University of Miami from 1980 to 1982, and then served as a critical care fellow at the University of Pittsburgh. He joined the faculty at the University of Texas Health Science Center at Houston in 1990. The following year he became Professor of Medicine and Anesthesiology at Loyola University Chicago.

Tobin is a pulmonologist at Edward Hines Jr. Veterans Administration Hospital and Loyola University Medical Center near Chicago.

Dr. Martin J. Tobin (MB BCh BAO 1975) is the recipient of the 2022 UCD Alumni Award in Research, Innovation and Impact

=== Rapid shallow breathing index ===
In 1991, Tobin and Karl L. Yang published a study that described two new indices, the rapid shallow breathing index (RSBI) – initially known as the Yang Tobin Index (Y/T) – and the compliance, respiratory rate, oxygenation, and maximal inspiratory pressure (CROP) index.

=== State v. Chauvin ===
In April 2021, Tobin was an expert witness for the prosecution at State v. Chauvin, the criminal trial against former police officer Derek Chauvin, who murdered George Floyd in Minneapolis in May 2020. Tobin testified that Floyd's immediate cause of death was low levels of oxygen resulting from three factors: being held in a semi-prone position on a paved street, the pressure of Officer Chauvin's knee and body on his neck and back, and his handcuffed left hand being pressed into his back.

Tobin stated, the knee on Floyd’s neck was compressing his hypopharynx. Tobin testified that the hypopharynx is very important but extremely small to breathe through, has no cartilage around it, which makes it vulnerable to occlusion. Tobin indicated positions in which Chauvin compressed Floyd's hypopharynx, exerting greater force on it. Tobin testified he can calculate the amount of the force, narrowing in the space that people breathe through and difficulty of breathing.

Exhibit named ‘Effect of Airway narrowing on Patient Effort to Breathe’ was presented. Exhibit contained the plot with efforts to breathe/ΔP outlet-inlet (Pa) on vertical axis, flow rate (L/min) on the horizontal axis and curves for different percentage of airway narrowing. Tobin explained that 60% narrowing produces no noticeable effect on breathing, it is only at 85% narrowing the curve abruptly takes off. Tobin testified the plot reflected physiological experiment. He said: ‘This is the science behind that plot.’

As footnote indicated, the plot was extracted from the article ‘Tracheal stenosis: a flow dynamics study’ by Mark Brouns, Santhosh T. Jayaraju, Chris Lacor, Johan De Mey, Marc Noppen, Walter Vincken, and Sylvia Verbanck, Journal of Applied Physiology 102: 1178– 1184, 2007. The authors of the article search for a way to detect tracheal stenosis on the early stage. They made computer simulation by artificially inserting tracheal stenosis into a realistic three-dimensional upper airway model derived from multislice computed tomography images of healthy men. They assessed flow patterns and pressure drops over tracheal stenosis in such artificial model. No experiment was held, no narrowing of the hypopharynx was considered in the article.

Tobin testified again that Mr Chauvin’s knee on Mr Floyd’s neck caused the narrowing of Mr Floyd’s hypopharynx. Earlier Tobin stated that the calculations (of difficulty of breathing) are true for anybody with this level of narrowing. He never testified what narrowing of hypopharynx or airway Floyd suffered as a result of Chauvin’s pressure. He only stated that breathing with such narrowing is akin to breathing through a drinking straw, but much worse, and we know this from physics.

He also testified that fentanyl detected in his system at a level of 11 ng/ml, while elevated, had not factored in his death. He additionally explained, with the help of still photos of the incident, how Floyd seemed to use various bodily maneuvers to attempt to breathe. He also stated that fentanyl overdose would have slowed Floyd’s breathing to below the normal rate, demonstrating that Floyd’s respiratory rate in a slow motion video was about 22 at one point, and saying that the normal respiratory rate ranges between 12 and 22 breaths per minute.

Tobin was called as a rebuttal witness after the defense team's forensic pathologist David Fowler suggested that prolonged inhalation of carbon monoxide (CO) fumes from the police cruiser's exhaust tailpipe could have been a cause-of-death factor. Tobin cited Floyd's Emergency Room arterial blood oxygen saturation level (98%) as inconsistent with carbon monoxide poisoning.
