= Ventilator-associated lung injury =

Type of acute lung injury

- Specialty: Pulmonology

Ventilator-associated lung injury (VALI) is an acute lung injury that develops during mechanical ventilation and is termed ventilator-induced lung injury (VILI) if it can be proven that the mechanical ventilation caused the acute lung injury. In contrast, ventilator-associated lung injury (VALI) exists if the cause cannot be proven. VALI is the appropriate term in most situations because it is virtually impossible to prove what actually caused the lung injury in the hospital.

== Cause ==
It is generally regarded, based on animal models and human studies, that volutrauma is the most harmful aspect of mechanical ventilation. This may be regarded as the over-stretching of the airways and alveoli.

During mechanical ventilation, the flow of gas into the lung will take the path of least resistance. Areas of the lung that are collapsed (atelectasis) or filled with secretions will be underinflated, while those areas that are relatively normal will be overinflated. These areas will become overdistended and injured. This may be reduced by using smaller tidal volumes.

During positive pressure ventilation, atelectatic regions will inflate, however, the alveoli will be unstable and will collapse during the expiratory phase of the breath (atelectotrauma). This repeated alveolar collapse and expansion (RACE) is thought to cause VALI. By opening the lung and keeping the lung open RACE (and VALI) is reduced.

Another possible ventilator-associated lung injury is known as biotrauma. Biotrauma involves the lung suffering injury from any mediators of the inflammatory response or from bacteremia.

Finally oxygen toxicity contributes to ventilator-associated lung injury through several mechanisms including oxidative stress.

Possible reasons for predisposition to VALI include:

- An injured lung may be at risk for further injury
- Cyclic atelectasis is particularly common in an injured lung

== Pathogenesis ==
Overdistension of alveoli and cyclic atelectasis (atelectotrauma) are the primary causes for alveolar injury during positive pressure mechanical ventilation. Severe injury to alveoli causes swelling of the tissues (edema) in the lungs, bleeding of the alveoli, loss of surfactant (decrease in lung compliance) and complete alveoli collapse (biotrauma). High flow rates are associated with rheotrauma, high volumes with volutrauma and pressures with barotrauma.

== Diagnosis ==
VALI does not need to be distinguished from progressive ALI/ARDS because management is the same in both. Additionally, definitive diagnosis of VALI may not be possible because of lack of sign or symptoms.

== Prevention ==
=== Preventing alveolar overdistension ===
Alveolar overdistension is mitigated by using small tidal volumes, maintaining a low plateau pressure, and most effectively by using volume-limited ventilation. A 2018 systematic review by The Cochrane Collaboration provided evidence that low tidal volume ventilation reduced post operative pneumonia and reduced the requirement for both invasive and non invasive ventilation after surgery

=== Preventing cyclic atelectasis (atelectotrauma) ===
Applied positive end-expiratory pressure (PEEP) is the principal method used to keep the alveoli open and lessen cyclic atelectasis.

=== Open lung ventilation ===
Open lung ventilation is a ventilatory strategy that combines small tidal volumes (to lessen alveolar overdistension) and an applied PEEP above the low inflection point on the pressure-volume curve (to lessen cyclic atelectasis).

High frequency ventilation is thought to reduce ventilator-associated lung injury, especially in the context of ARDS and acute lung injury.

Permissive hypercapnia and hypoxaemia allow the patient to be ventilated at less aggressive settings and can, therefore, mitigate all forms of ventilator-associated lung injury

== Epidemiology ==
VALI is most common in people receiving mechanical ventilation for acute lung injury or acute respiratory distress syndrome (ALI/ARDS).

24 percent of people mechanically ventilated will develop VALI for reasons other than ALI or ARDS. The incidence is probably higher among people who already have ALI/ARDS, but estimates vary widely. The variable estimates reflect the difficulty in distinguishing VALI from progressive ALI/ARDS.
