= Nasofrontal duct =

Duct in the nasal cavity

The nasofrontal duct is a duct connecting the infundibulum and frontal sinus.

A true nasofrontal duct only exists in 15% of the population.

Some sources prefer the term "frontal recess".
