= Radiographic supporting bone index =

Dental technique

The radiographic supporting bone index (RSBI) is a clinical index that allows dentists to measure facial alveolar bone in the horizontal or axial plane. It enables orthodontists and dentists placing dental implants, or completing esthetic dentistry, to accurately determine the amount of facial alveolar bone available before initiating treatment. Prior to the development of this index, orthodontists and dentists faced a serious risk of inducing iatrogenic gum recession following treatment.

Thin facial alveolar bone, including dehiscences or fenestrations, is considered a risk factor for gum recession. The risk of gum recession can increase following orthodontic treatment or dental implant treatment if bone volume is limited in the horizontal (axial) plane. Previously there was no defined tool to measure the quantity of facial alveolar bone. With the advent of 3D imaging in dentistry, through the use of Cone Beam Technology, the RSBI becomes a useful modality to predictably aid in orthodontic and dental implant treatment planning.
