= Mechanical ventilation =

Method to mechanically assist or replace spontaneous breathing

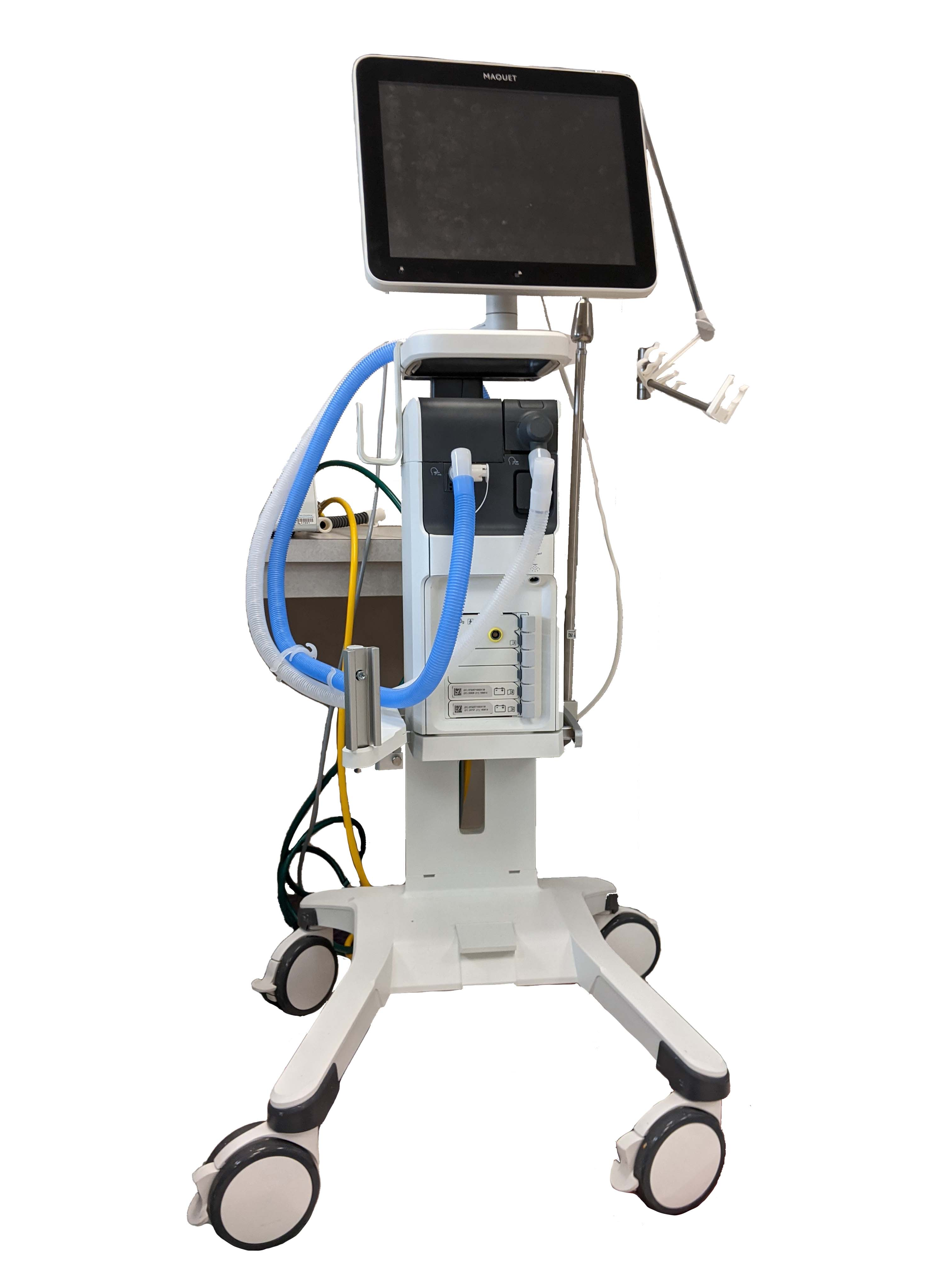
- Servo-u Ventilator
- ICD-9: 93.90 96.7
- MeSH: D012121
- OPS-301 code: 8-71

Mechanical ventilation or assisted ventilation is the medical term for using a ventilator machine to fully or partially provide artificial ventilation. Mechanical ventilation helps move air into and out of the lungs, with the main goal of helping the delivery of oxygen and removal of carbon dioxide. Mechanical ventilation is used for many reasons, including to protect the airway due to mechanical or neurologic cause, to ensure adequate oxygenation, or to remove excess carbon dioxide from the lungs. Various healthcare providers are involved with the use of mechanical ventilation and people who require ventilators are typically monitored in an intensive care unit.

Mechanical ventilation is termed invasive if it involves an instrument to create an airway that is placed inside the trachea. This is done through an endotracheal tube or nasotracheal tube. For non-invasive ventilation in people who are conscious, face or nasal masks are used. The two main types of mechanical ventilation include positive pressure ventilation where air is pushed into the lungs through the airways, and negative pressure ventilation where air is pulled into the lungs. There are many specific modes of mechanical ventilation, and their nomenclature has been revised over the decades as the technology has continually developed.

== History ==
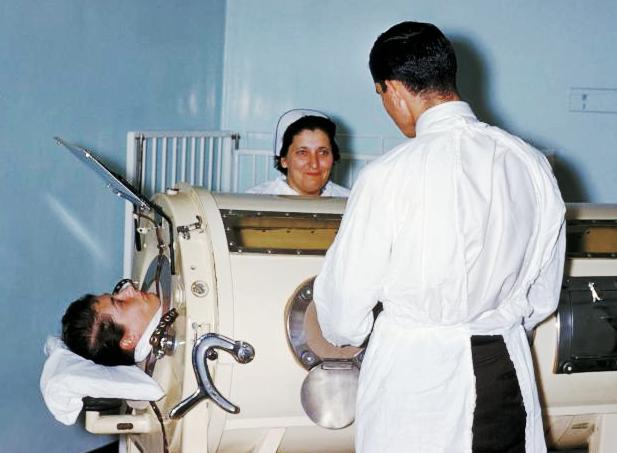
Hospital staff examine a patient in an Iron lung tank respirator during the polio epidemic. The machine creates a negative pressure around the thoracic cavity, thereby causing air to rush into the lungs to equalize intrapulmonary pressure.

The Greek physician Galen may have been the first to describe mechanical ventilation: "If you take a dead animal and blow air through its larynx [through a reed], you will fill its bronchi and watch its lungs attain the greatest distention." In the 1600s, Robert Hooke conducted experiments on dogs to demonstrate this concept. Vesalius too describes ventilation by inserting a reed or cane into the trachea of animals. These experiments predate the discovery of oxygen and its role in respiration. In 1908, George Poe demonstrated his mechanical respirator by asphyxiating dogs and seemingly bringing them back to life. These experiments all demonstrate positive pressure ventilation.

To achieve negative pressure ventilation, there must be a sub-atmospheric pressure to draw air into the lungs. This was first achieved in the late 19th century when John Dalziel and Alfred Jones independently developed tank ventilators, in which ventilation was achieved by enclosing a patient's body within a chamber of sub-atmospheric pressure. This machine came to be known colloquially as the Iron lung, which went through many iterations of development. The use of the iron lung became widespread during the polio epidemic of the 1900s.

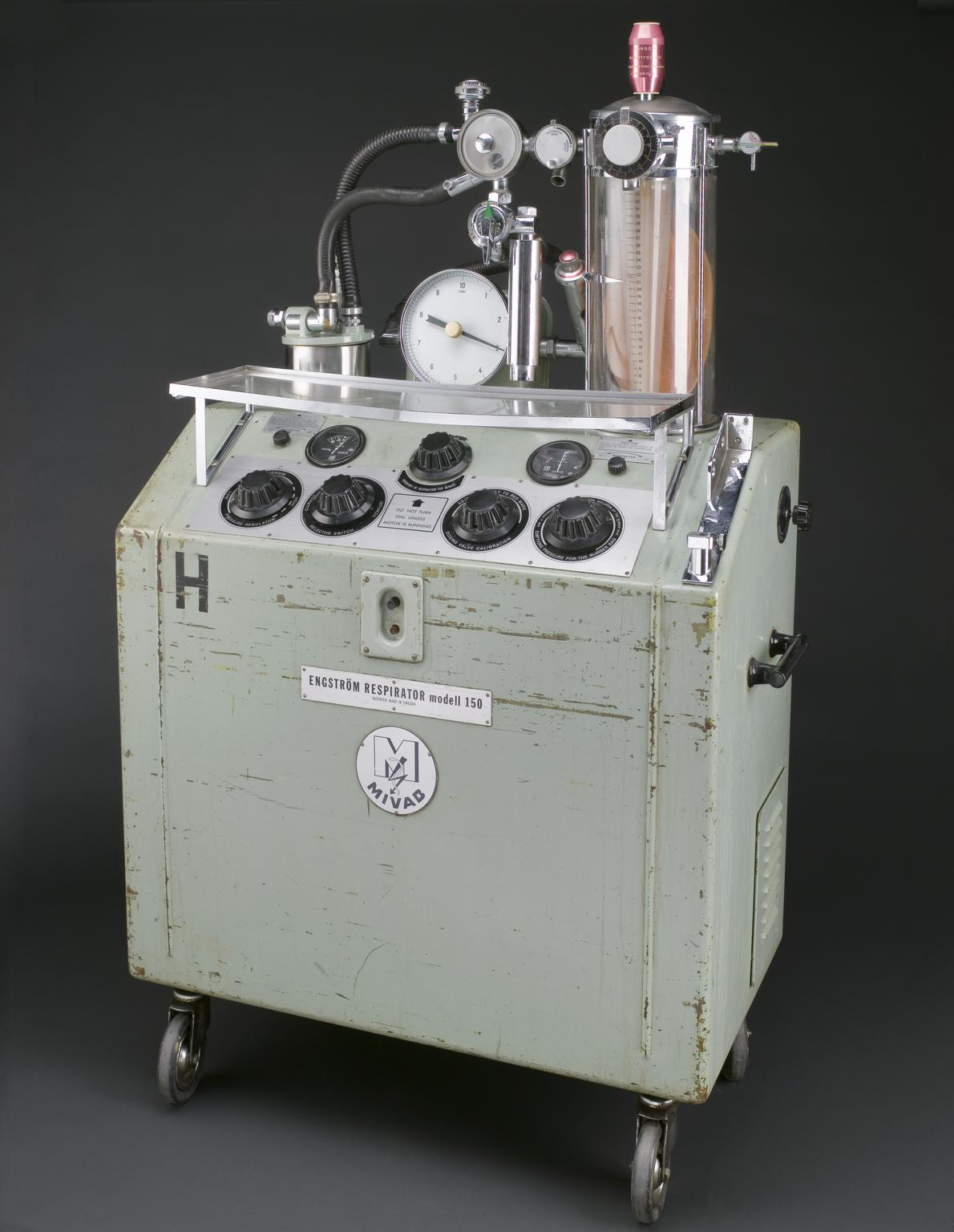
Engström 150

The first functional positive pressure ventilator was invented by Carl Gunnar Engström and was first used by Bjørn Aage Ibsen in Blegdamshospitalet, Copenhagen, Denmark in 1952. Denmark was experiencing a poliomyelitis epidemic, and there was only one iron lung in the hospital. The first patient to be saved by the new machine was 12-year old Vivi Ebert. Ibsen gave the patent on free use and licensed it to AGA, Sweden, to enable quick serial production of the new machines. The positive pressure ventilator quickly superseded the iron lung in Europe by 1953, but the older machine persisted in the United States.

Early ventilators were control style with no support breaths integrated into them and were limited to an inspiration to expiration ratio of 1:1. In the 1970s, intermittent mandatory ventilation was introduced as well as synchronized intermittent mandatory ventilation. These styles of ventilation had control breaths that patients could breathe between.

== Uses ==
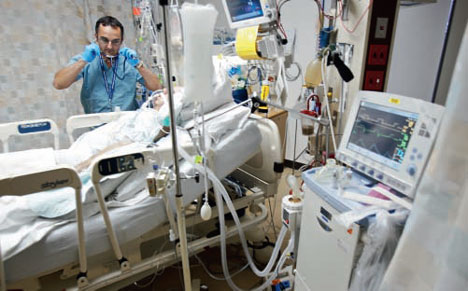
A respiratory therapist examining a mechanically ventilated patient in an intensive care unit. RTs participate in the optimization of ventilation management, adjustment, and weaning.

Mechanical ventilation is indicated when a patient's spontaneous breathing is inadequate to maintain life. It may be indicated in anticipation of imminent respiratory failure, acute respiratory failure, acute hypoxemia, or prophylactically. Because mechanical ventilation serves only to provide assistance for breathing and does not cure a disease, the patient's underlying condition should be identified and treated in order to liberate them from the ventilator.

Common specific medical indications for mechanical ventilation include:

- Surgical procedures
- Acute lung injury, including acute respiratory distress syndrome (ARDS), trauma, or COVID-19
- Pneumonia
- Pulmonary hemorrhage
- Apnea with respiratory arrest
- Hypoxemia
- Acute severe asthma requiring intubation
- Obstruction, such as a tumor
- Acid/base derangements such as respiratory acidosis
- Neurological diseases such as muscular dystrophy, amyotrophic lateral sclerosis (ALS), Guillain–Barré syndrome, myasthenia gravis including transient neonatal myasthenia gravis, etc.
- Newborn premature infants with neonatal respiratory distress syndrome
- Respiratory failure due to paralysis of the respiratory muscles caused by botulism

Mechanical ventilation is typically used as a short-term measure. It may, however, be used at home or in a nursing or rehabilitation institution for patients that have chronic illnesses that require long-term ventilatory assistance.

== Risks and complications ==
Mechanical ventilation is often a life-saving intervention, but carries potential complications. Common complications of positive pressure ventilation stemming directly from ventilator settings include volutrauma, barotrauma, and atelectrauma. These mechanisms contribute to ventilator-induced lung injury (VILI). Patients with pre-existing lung injury, in particular patients with acute respiratory distress syndrome (ARDS), are especially vulnerable to additional ventilator-associated lung injury. Excessive pressure or volume delivered by the ventilator can also cause pneumothorax, subcutaneous emphysema, pneumomediastinum, and pneumoperitoneum. Other complications of mechanical ventilation include diaphragm atrophy, decreased cardiac output, and oxygen toxicity.

In many healthcare systems, prolonged ventilation as part of intensive care is a limited resource. For this reason, decisions to commence and remove ventilation may raise ethical debate and often involve legal orders such as do-not-resuscitate orders.

Mechanical ventilation is often associated with many painful procedures and the ventilation itself can be uncomfortable. For infants who require opioids for pain, the potential side effects of opioids include problems with feeding, gastric and intestinal mobility problems, the potential for opioid dependence, and opioid tolerance.

=== Withdrawal from mechanical ventilation ===
Timing of withdrawal from mechanical ventilation—also known as weaning—is important. Patients should be considered for weaning as soon as they are able to support their own ventilation and oxygenation, and this should be assessed continuously. The following objective parameters can guide this decision:

Spontaneous breathing trials are conducted to assess the likelihood of a patient being able to maintain stability and breath on their own without the ventilator. This is done by changing to a continuous spontaneous ventilation (CSV) mode that provides support only to compensate for the added resistance of the endotracheal tube.

The Rapid Shallow Breathing Index (RSBI, the ratio of respiratory frequency to tidal volume (f/VT), previously referred to as the "Yang Tobin Index" or "Tobin Index" after Dr. Karl Yang and Prof. Martin J. Tobin of Loyola University Medical Center) is one of the best studied and most commonly used weaning predictors, though it is limited by moderate sensitivity and poor specificity. It was described in a prospective cohort study of mechanically ventilated patients which found that a RSBI > 105 breaths/min/L was associated with weaning failure.

A cuff leak test may be performed before extubation in patients at high risk of post-extubation stridor caused by laryngeal edema. The cuff of the endotracheal tube is deflated, and little or no air leakage around the tube may indicate upper airway narrowing.

== Physiology ==
The function of the lungs is to provide gas exchange via oxygenation and ventilation. This phenomenon of respiration involves the physiologic concepts of air flow, tidal volume, compliance, resistance, and dead space. Other relevant concepts include alveolar ventilation, arterial PaCO2, alveolar volume, and F_{I}O_{2}. Alveolar ventilation is the amount of gas per unit of time that reaches the alveoli and becomes involved in gas exchange. PaCO2 is the partial pressure of carbon dioxide of arterial blood, which determines how well carbon dioxide is able to move out of the body. Alveolar volume is the volume of air entering and leaving the alveoli per minute. Mechanical dead space is another important parameter in ventilator design and function, and is defined as the volume of gas breathed again as the result of use in a mechanical device.

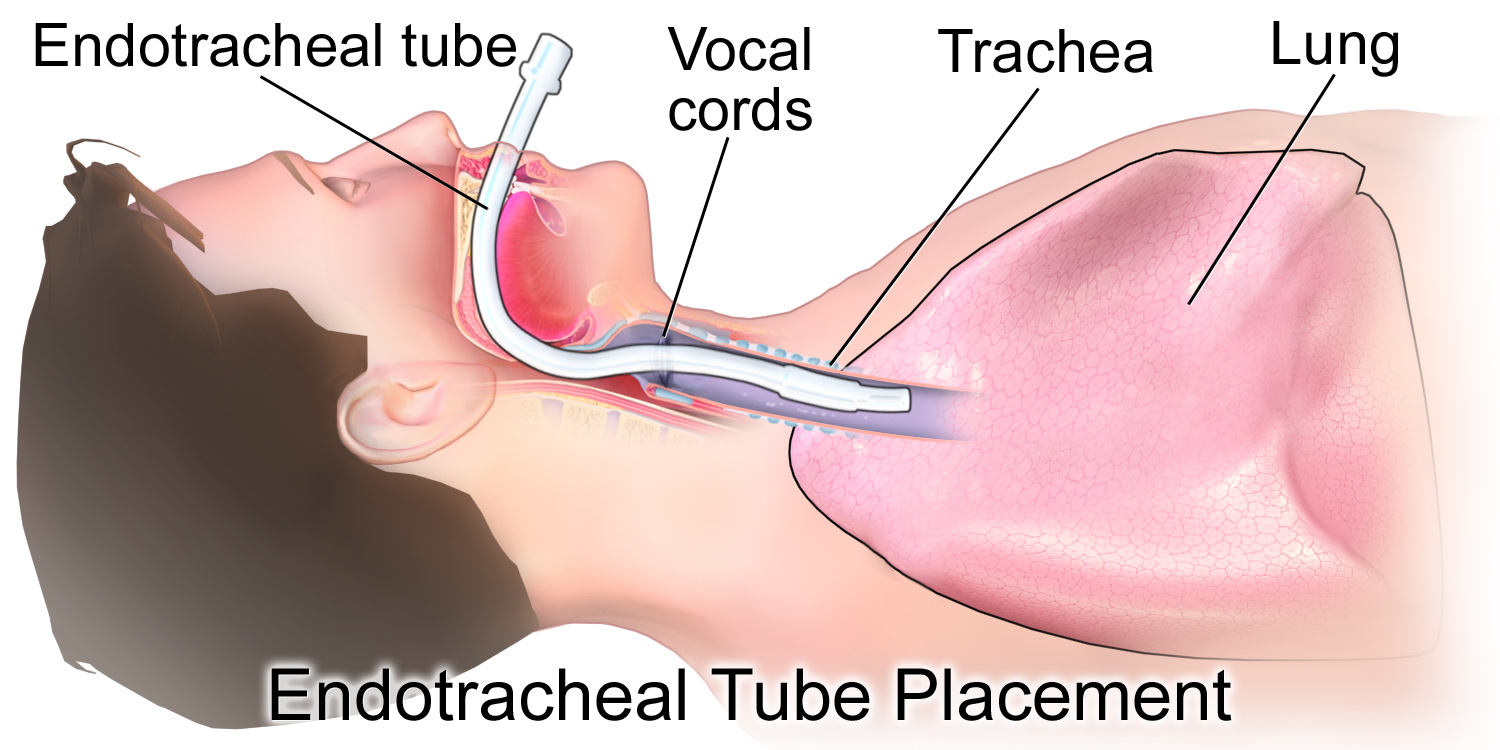
Image of endotracheal tube placement required to connect a patient's physiologic airway to the ventilator.

Due to the anatomy of the human pharynx, larynx, and esophagus and the circumstances for which ventilation is needed, additional measures are required to secure the airway during positive-pressure ventilation in order to allow unimpeded passage of air into the trachea and avoid air passing into the esophagus and stomach. The common method is by insertion of a tube into the trachea. Intubation, which provides a clear route for the air can be either an endotracheal tube, inserted through the natural openings of mouth or nose, or a tracheostomy inserted through an artificial opening in the neck. In other circumstances simple airway maneuvers, an oropharyngeal airway or laryngeal mask airway may be employed. If non-invasive ventilation or negative-pressure ventilation is used, then an airway adjunct is not needed.

Pain medicine such as opioids are sometimes used in adults and infants who require mechanical ventilation. For preterm or full term infants who require mechanical ventilation, there is no strong evidence to prescribe opioids or sedation routinely for these procedures, however, some select infants requiring mechanical ventilation may require pain medicine such as opioids. It is not clear if clonidine is safe or effective to be used as a sedative for preterm and full term infants who require mechanical ventilation.

When 100% oxygen (1.00 F_{I}O_{2}) is used initially for an adult, it is easy to calculate the next F_{I}O_{2} to be used, and easy to estimate the shunt fraction. The estimated shunt fraction refers to the amount of oxygen not being absorbed into the circulation. In normal physiology, gas exchange of oxygen and carbon dioxide occurs at the level of the alveoli in the lungs. The existence of a shunt refers to any process that hinders this gas exchange, leading to wasted oxygen inspired and the flow of un-oxygenated blood back to the left heart, which ultimately supplies the rest of the body with de-oxygenated blood. When using 100% oxygen, the degree of shunting is estimated as 700 mmHg - measured P_{A}O_{2}. For each difference of 100 mmHg, the shunt is 5%. A shunt of more than 25% should prompt a search for the cause of this hypoxemia, such as mainstem intubation or pneumothorax, and should be treated accordingly. If such complications are not present, other causes must be sought after, and positive end-expiratory pressure (PEEP) should be used to treat this intrapulmonary shunt. Other such causes of a shunt include:

- alveolar collapse from major atelectasis
- alveolar collection of material other than gas, such as pus from pneumonia, water and protein from acute respiratory distress syndrome, water from congestive heart failure, or blood from hemorrhage

== Technique ==
=== Modes ===
Mechanical ventilation utilizes several separate systems for ventilation, referred to as the mode. Modes come in many different delivery concepts, but all conventional positive pressure ventilators modes fall into one of two categories:volume-cycled or pressure-cycled. A relatively new ventilation mode is flow-controlled ventilation (FCV). FCV is a fully dynamic mode without significant periods of 'no flow'. It is based on creating a stable gas flow into or out of the patient's lungs to generate an inspiration or expiration, respectively. This results in linear increases and decreases in intratracheal pressure. In contrast the conventional modes of ventilation, there are no abrupt drop intrathoracic pressure drops, because of the controlled expiration. Further, this mode allows to use thin endotracheal tubes (~2 – 10 mm inner diameter) to ventilate a patient as expiration is actively supported. In general, the selection of which mode of mechanical ventilation to use for a given patient is based on the familiarity of clinicians with modes and the equipment availability at a particular institution.

== Types ==
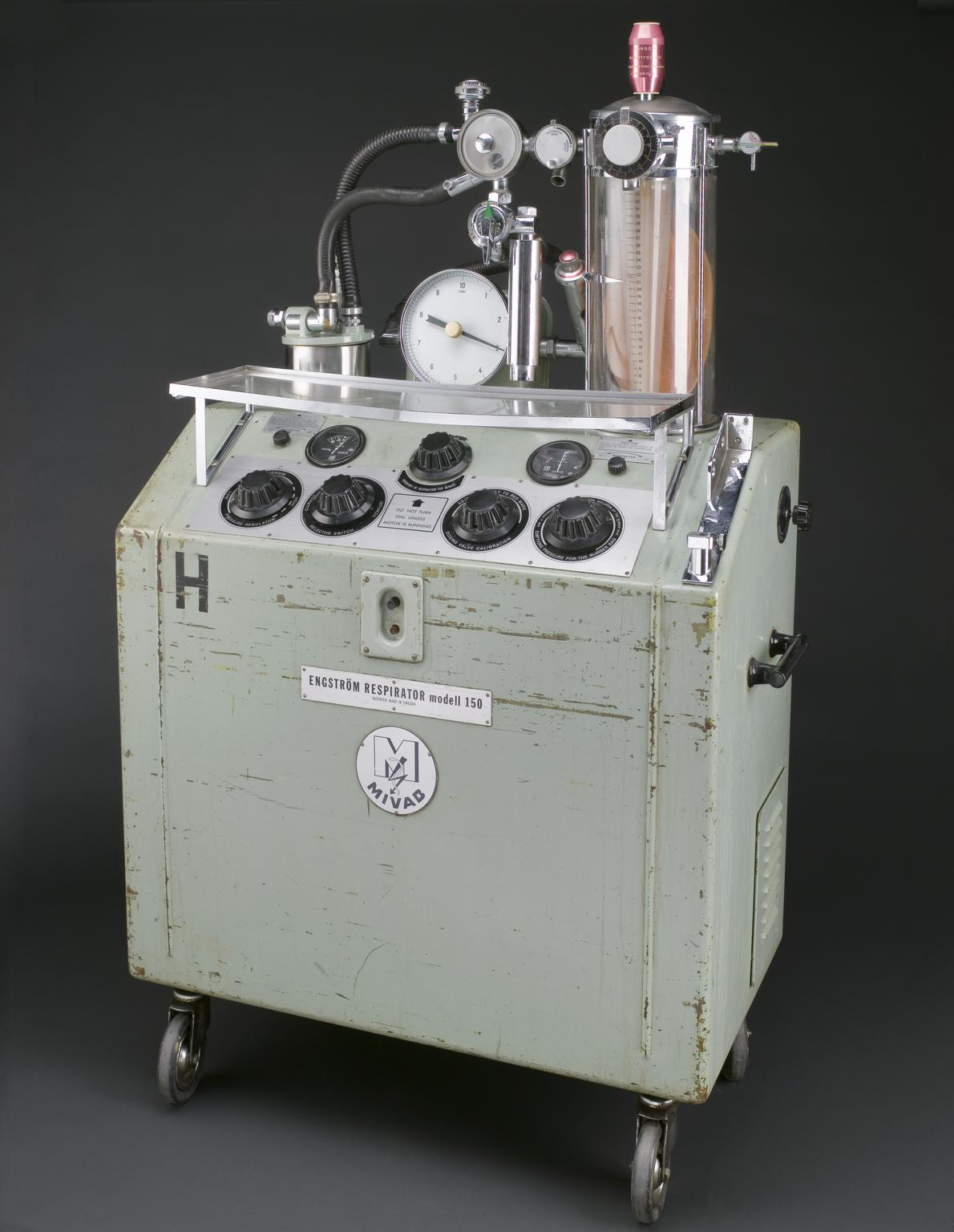
Carl Gunnar Engström invented in 1950 one of the first intermittent positive pressure ventilator, which delivers air straight into the lungs using an endotracheal tube placed into the windpipe.

=== Positive pressure ===
The design of the modern positive-pressure ventilators were based mainly on technical developments by the military during World War II to supply oxygen to fighter pilots in high altitude. Such ventilators replaced the iron lungs as safe endotracheal tubes with high-volume/low-pressure cuffs were developed. The popularity of positive-pressure ventilators rose during the polio epidemic in the 1950s in Scandinavia and the United States and was the beginning of modern ventilation therapy. Positive pressure through manual supply of 50% oxygen through a tracheostomy tube led to a reduced mortality rate among patients with polio and respiratory paralysis. However, because of the sheer amount of man-power required for such manual intervention, mechanical positive-pressure ventilators became increasingly popular.

Positive-pressure ventilators work by increasing the patient's airway pressure through an endotracheal or tracheostomy tube. The positive pressure allows air to flow into the airway until the ventilator breath is terminated. Then, the airway pressure drops to zero, and the elastic recoil of the chest wall and lungs push the tidal volume—the breath-out through passive exhalation.

=== Negative pressure ===
Negative pressure mechanical ventilators are produced in small, field-type and larger formats. The prominent design of the smaller devices is known as the cuirass, a shell-like unit used to create negative pressure only to the chest using a combination of a fitting shell and a soft bladder. In recent years this device has been manufactured using various-sized polycarbonate shells with multiple seals, and a high-pressure oscillation pump in order to carry out biphasic cuirass ventilation. Its main use has been in patients with neuromuscular disorders that have some residual muscular function. The latter, larger formats are in use, notably with the polio wing hospitals in England such as St Thomas' Hospital in London and the John Radcliffe in Oxford.

The larger units have their origin in the iron lung, also known as the Drinker and Shaw tank, which was developed in 1928 by J.H Emerson Company and was one of the first negative-pressure machines used for long-term ventilation. It was refined and used in the 20th century largely as a result of the polio epidemic that struck the world in the 1940s. The machine is, in effect, a large elongated tank, which encases the patient up to the neck. The neck is sealed with a rubber gasket so that the patient's face (and airway) are exposed to the room air. While the exchange of oxygen and carbon dioxide between the bloodstream and the pulmonary airspace works by diffusion and requires no external work, air must be moved into and out of the lungs to make it available to the gas exchange process. In spontaneous breathing, a negative pressure is created in the pleural cavity by the muscles of respiration, and the resulting gradient between the atmospheric pressure and the pressure inside the thorax generates a flow of air. In the iron lung by means of a pump, the air is withdrawn mechanically to produce a vacuum inside the tank, thus creating negative pressure. This negative pressure leads to expansion of the chest, which causes a decrease in intrapulmonary pressure, and increases flow of ambient air into the lungs. As the vacuum is released, the pressure inside the tank equalizes to that of the ambient pressure, and the elastic recoil of the chest and lungs leads to passive exhalation. However, when the vacuum is created, the abdomen also expands along with the lung, cutting off venous flow back to the heart, leading to pooling of venous blood in the lower extremities. The patients can talk and eat normally, and can see the world through a well-placed series of mirrors. Some could remain in these iron lungs for years at a time quite successfully.

Some of the problems with the full body design were such as being unable to control the inspiratory to expiratory ratio and the flow rate. This design also caused blood pooling in the legs.

=== Intermittent abdominal pressure ventilator ===
Another type is the intermittent abdominal pressure ventilator that applies pressure externally via an inflated bladder, forcing exhalation, sometimes termed exsufflation. The first such apparatus was the Bragg-Paul Pulsator. The name of one such device, the Pneumobelt made by Puritan Bennett has to a degree become a generic name for the type.

=== Oscillator ===
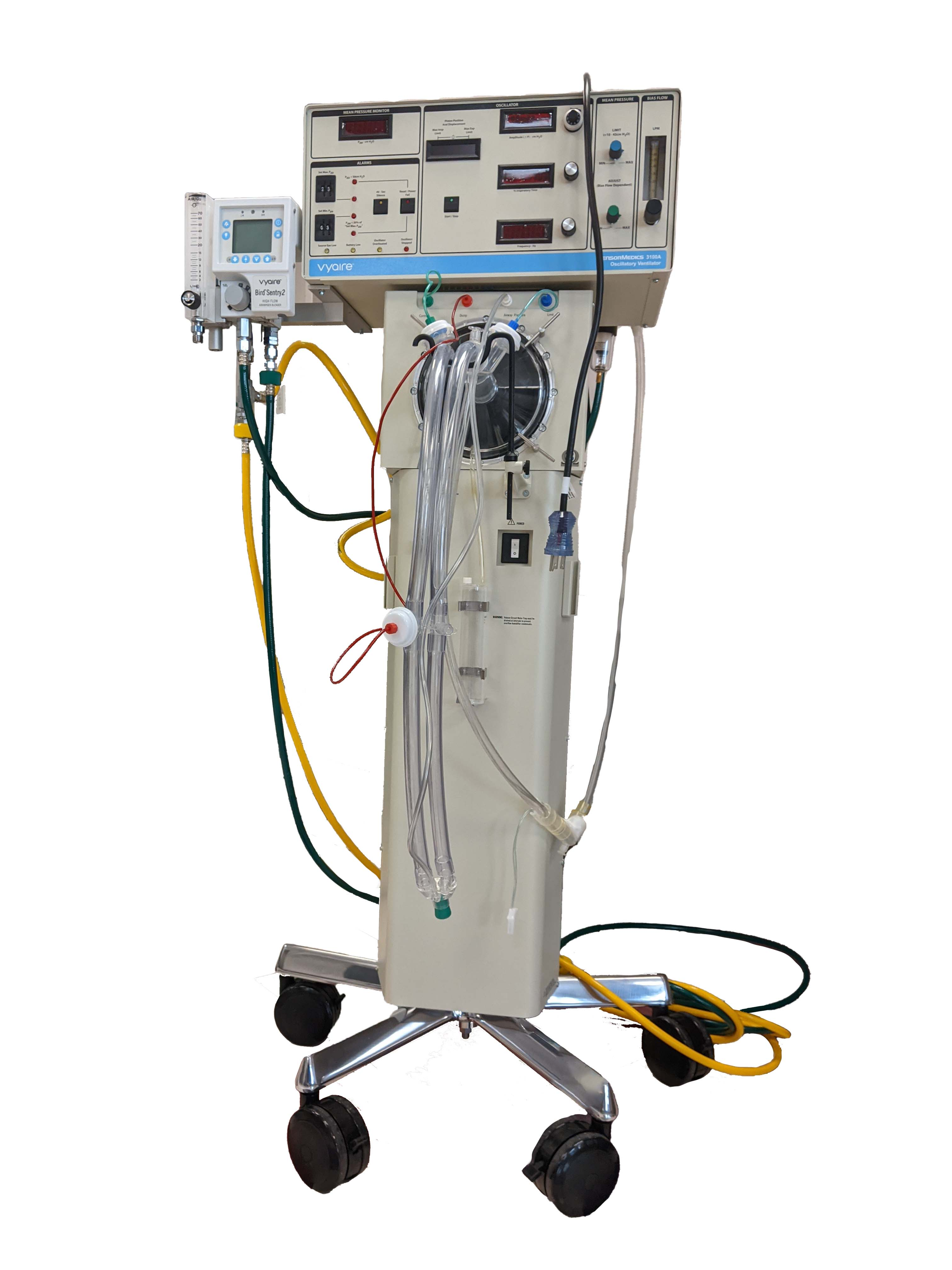
3100A Oscillator

The most commonly used high frequency ventilator and only one approved in the United States is the 3100A from Vyaire Medical. It works by using very small tidal volumes by setting amplitude and a high rate set in hertz. This type of ventilation is primarily used in neonates and pediatric patients who are failing conventional ventilation.

=== High frequency jet ventilation ===
The first type of high frequency ventilator made for neonates and the only jet type is made by Bunnell Incorporated. It works in conjunction with a separate CMV ventilator to add pulses of air to the control breaths and PEEP.

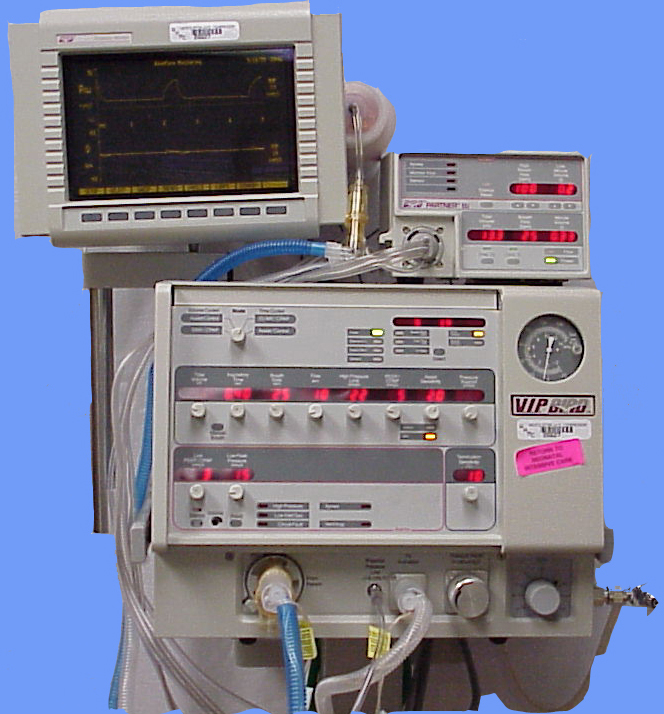
Neonatal Jet ventilator

=== One lung ventilation ===
In some situations as intrathoracic surgery or massive airway bleeding, there can be a need to separate one lung from ventilation and use a single lung for gas exchange. Usually, a double lumen tube is inserted for this procedure, but even a bronchial blocker may be used. To maintain a sufficient gas exchange and avoid trauma in the ventilated lung, tidal volume and respiratory rate should be adjusted, which may lead to higher mechanical stress and inflammatory reactions. Furthermore, a hypoxic vasonstriction reflex in the non-ventilated lung is triggering several physiological changes that may compromise the hemodynamic situation of the patient.

== Monitoring ==
One of the main reasons why a patient is admitted to an ICU is for delivery of mechanical ventilation. Monitoring a patient in mechanical ventilation has many clinical applications: Enhance understanding of pathophysiology, aid with diagnosis, guide patient management, avoid complications, and assess trends.

In ventilated patients, pulse oximetry is commonly used when titrating FIO2. A reliable target of Spo2 is greater than 95%.

The total PEEP in the patient can be determined by doing an expiratory hold on the ventilator. If this is higher than the set PEEP, this indicates air trapping.

The plateau pressure can be found by doing an inspiratory hold. This shows the actual pressure the patient's lungs are experiencing.

Loops can be used to see what is occurring in the patient's lungs. These include flow-volume and pressure-volume loops. They can show changes in compliance and resistance.

Functional Residual Capacity can be determined when using the GE Carestation.

Modern ventilators have advanced monitoring tools. There are also monitors that work independently of the ventilator which allow for measuring patients after the ventilator has been removed, such as a Tracheal tube test.

== Types of ventilators ==
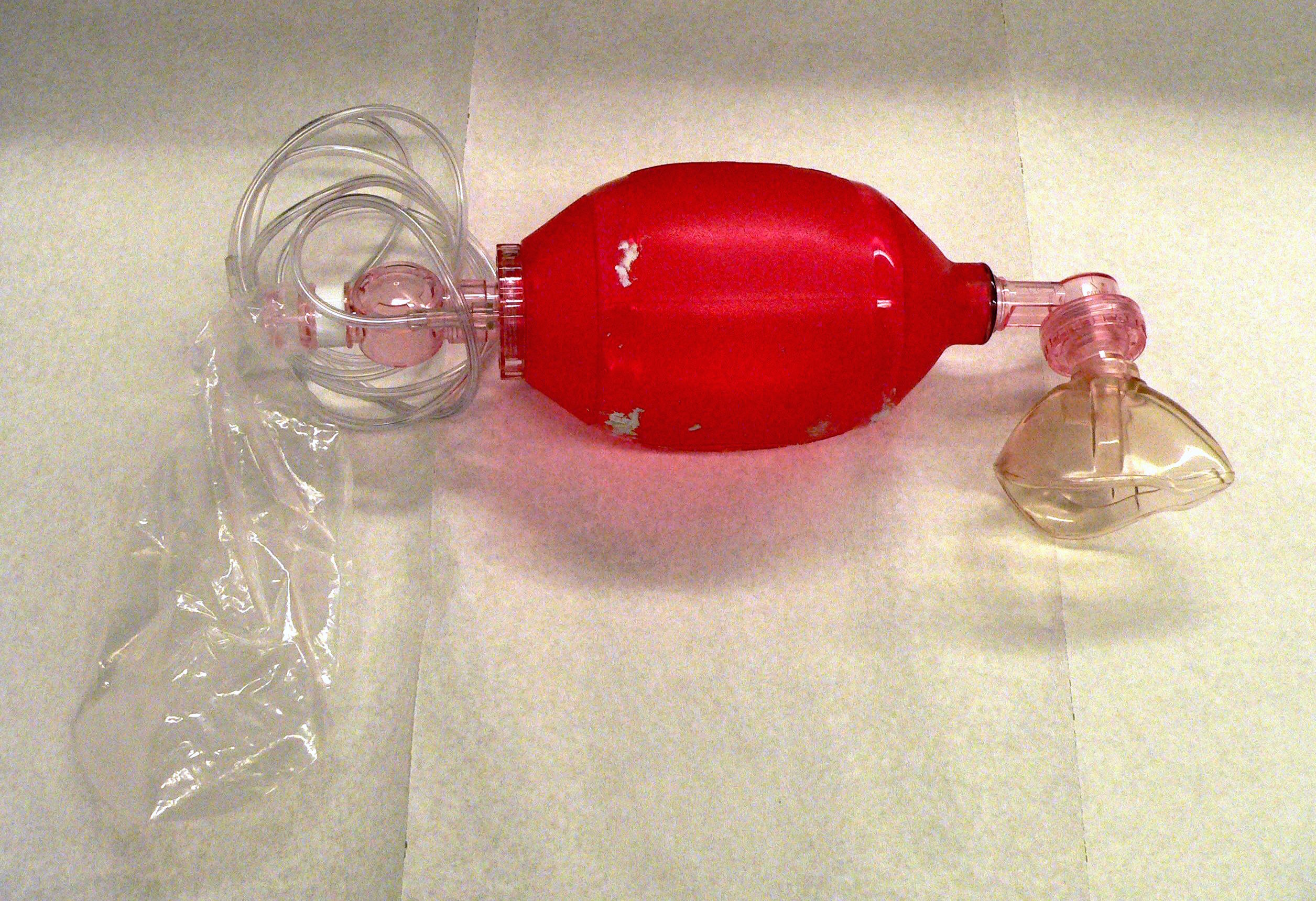
SMART BAG MO Bag-Valve-Mask Resuscitator

Ventilators come in many different styles and method of giving a breath to sustain life. There are manual ventilators such as bag valve masks and anesthesia bags that require the users to hold the ventilator to the face or to an artificial airway and maintain breaths with their hands. Mechanical ventilators are ventilators not requiring operator effort and are typically computer-controlled or pneumatic-controlled. Mechanical ventilators typically require power by a battery or a wall outlet (DC or AC) though some ventilators work on a pneumatic system not requiring power. There are a variety of technologies available for ventilation, falling into two main (and then lesser categories), the two being the older technology of negative-pressure mechanisms, and the more common positive-pressure types.

Common positive-pressure mechanical ventilators include:

1. Transport ventilators—These ventilators are small and more rugged, and can be powered pneumatically or via AC or DC power sources.
2. Intensive-care ventilators—These ventilators are larger and usually run on AC power (though virtually all contain a battery to facilitate intra-facility transport and as a back-up in the event of a power failure). This style of ventilator often provides greater control of a wide variety of ventilation parameters (such as inspiratory rise time). Many ICU ventilators also incorporate graphics to provide visual feedback of each breath.
3. Neonatal ventilators (bubble CPAP, HFJV, HFOV)—Designed with the preterm neonate in mind, these are a specialized subset of ICU ventilators that are designed to deliver smaller volumes and pressures to these patients. These may be conventional or high frequency types.
4. Positive airway pressure ventilators (PAP)—These ventilators are specifically designed for non-invasive ventilation. This includes ventilators for use at home for treatment of chronic conditions such as sleep apnea or COPD and in the ICU setting.

== Breath delivery mechanisms ==
=== Trigger ===
The trigger, either flow or pressure, is what causes a breath to be delivered by a mechanical ventilator. Breaths may be triggered by a patient taking their own breath, a ventilator operator pressing a manual breath button, or based on the set respiratory rate.

=== Cycle ===
The cycle is what causes the breath to transition from the inspiratory phase to the exhalation phase. Breaths may be cycled by a mechanical ventilator when a set time has been reached, or when a preset flow or percentage of the maximum flow delivered during a breath is reached depending on the breath type and the settings. Breaths can also be cycled when an alarm condition such as a high pressure limit has been reached.

=== Limit ===
Limit is how the breath is controlled. Breaths may be limited to a set maximum pressure or volume.

=== Breath exhalation ===
Exhalation in mechanical ventilation is almost always completely passive. The ventilator's expiratory valve is opened, and expiratory flow is allowed until the baseline pressure (PEEP) is reached. Expiratory flow is determined by patient factors such as compliance and resistance.

== Artificial airways as a connection to the ventilator ==
There are various procedures and mechanical devices that provide protection against airway collapse, air leakage, and aspiration:

- Face mask—In resuscitation and for minor procedures under anaesthesia, a face mask is often sufficient to achieve a seal against air leakage. Airway patency of the unconscious patient is maintained either by manipulation of the jaw or by the use of nasopharyngeal or oropharyngeal airway. These are designed to provide a passage of air to the pharynx through the nose or mouth, respectively. Poorly fitted masks often cause nasal bridge ulcers, a problem for some patients. Face masks are also used for non-invasive ventilation in conscious patients. A full-face mask does not, however, provide protection against aspiration. Non-invasive ventilation can be considered for epidemics of COVID-19 where sufficient invasive ventilation capacity is not available (or in some milder cases), but pressurized protection suits for caregivers are recommended due to the risks of poorly fitting masks emitting contaminating aerosols.
- Tracheal intubation is often performed for mechanical ventilation of hours to weeks duration. A tube is inserted through the nose (nasotracheal intubation) or mouth (orotracheal intubation) and advanced into the trachea. In most cases, tubes with inflatable cuffs are used for protection against leakage and aspiration. Intubation with a cuffed tube is thought to provide the best protection against aspiration. Tracheal tubes inevitably cause pain and coughing. Therefore, unless a patient is unconscious or anaesthetized for other reasons, sedative drugs are usually given to provide tolerance of the tube. Other disadvantages of tracheal intubation include damage to the mucosal lining of the nasopharynx or oropharynx and subglottic stenosis.
- Supraglottic airway—A supraglottic airway (SGA) is any airway device that is seated above and outside the trachea, as an alternative to endotracheal intubation. Most devices work via masks or cuffs that inflate to isolate the trachea for oxygen delivery. Newer devices feature esophageal ports for suctioning or ports for tube exchange to allow intubation. Supraglottic airways differ primarily from tracheal intubation in that they do not prevent aspiration. After the introduction of the laryngeal mask airway (LMA) in 1998, supraglottic airway devices have become mainstream in both elective and emergency anesthesia. There are many types of SGAs available including the esophageal-tracheal combitube (ETC), laryngeal tube (LT), and the obsolete esophageal obturator airway (EOA).
- Cricothyrotomy—Patients requiring emergency airway management, in whom tracheal intubation has been unsuccessful, may require an airway inserted through a surgical opening in the cricothyroid membrane. This is similar to a tracheostomy but a cricothyrotomy is reserved for emergency access.
- Tracheostomy—When patients require mechanical ventilation for several weeks, a tracheostomy may provide the most suitable access to the trachea. A tracheostomy is a surgically created passage into the trachea. Tracheostomy tubes are well tolerated and often do not necessitate any use of sedative drugs. Tracheostomy tubes may be inserted early during treatment in patients with pre-existing severe respiratory disease, or in any patient expected to be difficult to wean from mechanical ventilation, i.e., patients with little muscular reserve.
- Mouthpiece—Less common interface, does not provide protection against aspiration. There are lipseal mouthpieces with flanges to help hold them in place if patient is unable.

== See also ==
- Biotrauma – Severe inflammatory response in mechanical ventilator patients
- Charles Hederer, inventor of the pulmoventilateur
- Mean airway pressure
