= Carl Gunnar Engström =

Swedish physician and inventor

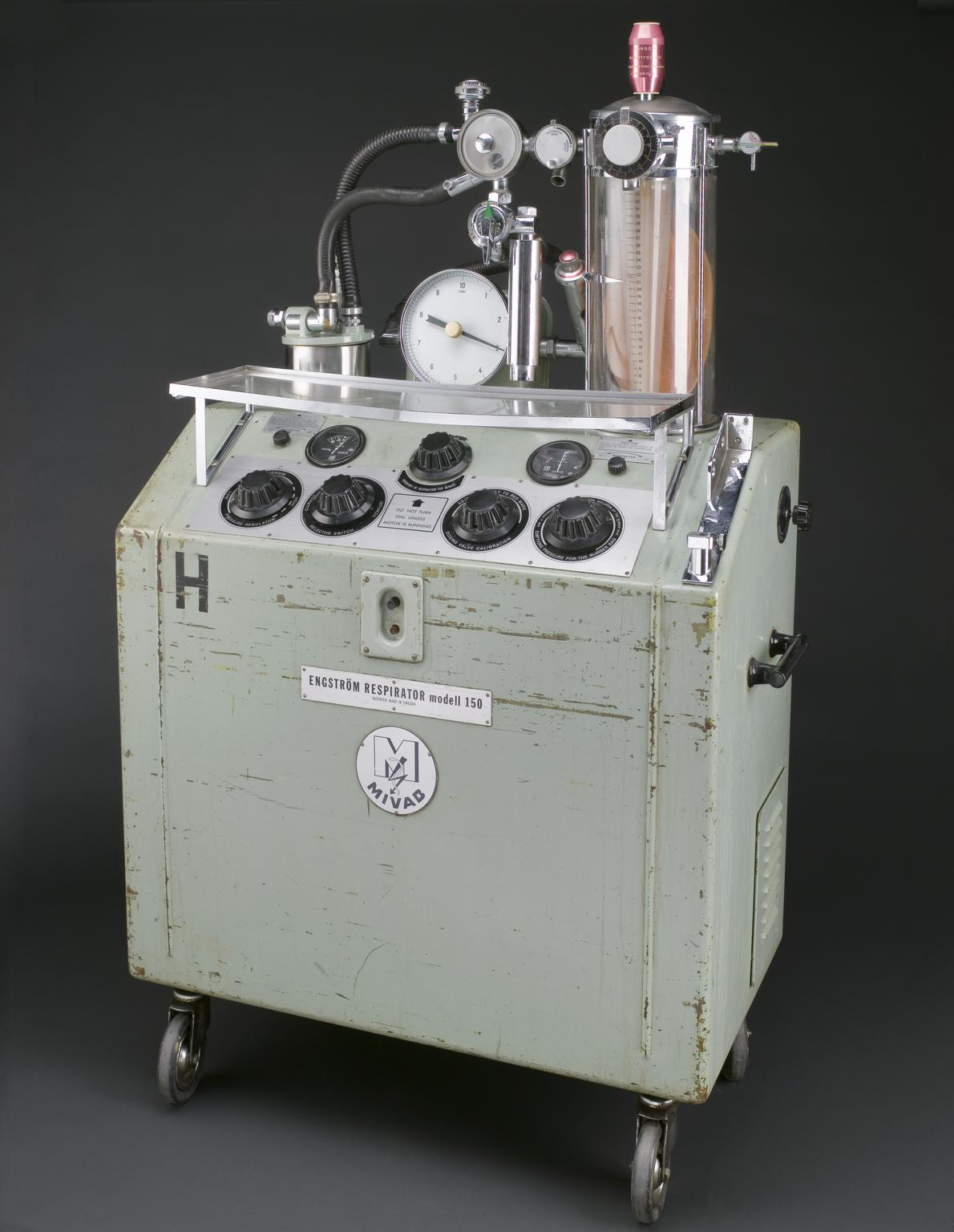
The Engtröm 150 artificial respirator, which delivered air straight into the lungs using an endotracheal tube placed into the windpipe, was invented by Carl-Gunnar Engström.

Carl Gunnar David Engström (1 September 1912 – 9 January 1987) was a Swedish physician and innovator. He is the inventor of the first intermittent positive pressure mechanical ventilator that could deliver breaths of controllable volume and frequency and also deliver inhalation anesthetics.

The Engström150 Respirator (EngströmUniversal Respirator) began series production in 1954. The basic principle of the mechanical ventilator is still the same today, but a technological leap was made with the Siemens-Elema servo fan in the 1970s.

== Life ==
Engström was born on 1 September 1912 in Oskarshamn to Carl Johan Engström and Judith Ringberg. He obtained is degree in medicine in 1941. He worked from 1941 at Stockholm Hospital for Infectious Diseases and started to work in the Swedish Air Force in 1956. He got his PhD in medicine at Uppsala University in 1963 with a thesis entitled The clinical application of prolonged controlled ventilation: with special reference to a method developed by the author.

Before the invention of Engström, the only available respirator was the iron lung. It is a negative pressure ventilator, a mechanical respirator which encloses most of a person's body, and varies the air pressure in the enclosed space, to stimulate breathing. It assists breathing when muscle control is lost, or the work of breathing exceeds the person's ability suffering from polio and botulism and certain poisons (for example, barbiturates, tubocurarine).

Rows of iron lungs filled hospital wards at the height of the polio outbreaks of the 1940s and 1950s helping children, and some adults, with bulbar polio and bulbospinal polio. A polio patient with a paralyzed diaphragm would typically spend two weeks inside an iron lung while recovering. This machine kept the patient breathing, with the help of underpressure and overpressure. The whole body, except the head, was placed in a pressure chamber, where it was not possible to regulate how much air the patient received. Engstrom found that the iron lungs did not adequately ventilate patients with severe poliomyelitis.

This problem solved Engström with his respirator, by blowing air into the patient's lungs via a simple tube through the trachea. The respirator had a cylinder and a pump to determine the amount of air. A tube was inserted into the patient's trachea, a small balloon was inflated as a seal around the tube, and then the respirator pumped air into the lungs. The amount of air and the amount per unit of time was set with a knob.

Engström patented the respirator in 1950. Engstrom's respirators were used for the first time in Blegdams Hospital, Copenhagen, Denmark, during a polio outbreak in 1952. Engström respirators were also tested in the 1953 Swedish polio epidemic.

The Engstrom 150 Respirator (Engstrom Universal Respirator) began series production in 1954. Mivab, the company that first manufactured Engström's respirator, is today a part of the Datex / Ohmeda division of General Electric Health Care.

Positive pressure ventilation systems are now more common than negative pressure systems like the iron lungs. It proved to be lifesaving in other conditions including respiratory insufficiency and soon superseded the iron lung throughout Europe.
