= Acute severe asthma =

- Other names: Status asthmaticus, asthmatic status
- Specialty: Respirology
- Symptoms: Anxiety, panic, laboring to breathe, tightened neck and chest muscles, difficulty performing normal daily activities
- Usual onset: Silent chest, worsening symptoms despite use of medication.

Acute severe asthma, also known as status asthmaticus, is an acute exacerbation of asthma that does not respond to standard treatments of bronchodilators (inhalers) and corticosteroids. Asthma is caused by multiple genes, some having protective effect, with each gene having its own tendency to be influenced by the environment although a genetic link leading to acute severe asthma is still unknown. Symptoms include chest tightness, rapidly progressive dyspnea (shortness of breath), dry cough, use of accessory respiratory muscles, fast and/or labored breathing, and extreme wheezing. It is a life-threatening episode of airway obstruction and is considered a medical emergency. Complications include cardiac and/or respiratory arrest. The increasing prevalence of atopy and asthma remains unexplained but may be due to infection with respiratory viruses.

== Signs and symptoms ==
An exacerbation (attack) of asthma is experienced as a worsening of asthma symptoms with breathlessness and cough (often worse at night). In acute severe asthma, breathlessness may be so severe that it is impossible to speak more than a few words (inability to complete sentences).

On examination, the respiratory rate may be elevated (more than 25 breaths per minute), and the heart rate may be rapid (110 beats per minute or faster). Reduced oxygen saturation levels (but above 92%) are often encountered. Examination of the lungs with a stethoscope may reveal reduced air entry and/or widespread wheeze. The peak expiratory flow can be measured at the bedside; in acute severe asthma, the flow is less than 50% of a person's normal or predicted flow.

Very severe acute asthma (termed "near-fatal" as there is an immediate risk to life) is characterised by a peak flow of less than 33% predicted, oxygen saturations below 92% or cyanosis (blue discoloration, usually of the lips), absence of audible breath sounds over the chest ("silent chest" : wheezing is not heard because there is not enough air movement to generate it), reduced respiratory effort and visible exhaustion or drowsiness. Irregularities in the heartbeat and abnormal lowering of the blood pressure may be observed.

Severe asthma attack can cause symptoms such as:

- Shortness of breath
- Inability to speak in full sentences
- Feeling breathless even when lying down
- Chest feels tight
- Bluish tint to the lips
- Hunched shoulders, and strained muscles in stomach and neck
- Feeling the need to sit or stand up to breathe more easily

== Cause ==
The cause for acute severe asthma attacks is still unknown and experts are also unsure of why it developed and why it does not respond to typical asthma treatments.

- Not seeing a doctor regularly, therefore asthma is not under good control
- Coming in contact with asthma triggers
- Allergies or severe allergic reactions
- Not using the peak flow meter and not taking asthma medication as directed by a primary care physician (PCP) correctly
- Not following an asthma action plan correctly
- Respiratory infections
- Severe stress
- Cold weather
- Air pollution
- Exposure to chemicals and other irritants
- Smoking

== Mechanism ==
Inflammation in asthma is characterized by an influx of eosinophils during the early-phase reaction and a mixed cellular infiltrate composed of eosinophils, mast cells, lymphocytes, and neutrophils during the late-phase (or chronic) reaction. The simple explanation for allergic inflammation in asthma begins with the development of a predominantly helper T2 lymphocyte–driven, as opposed to helper T1 lymphocyte–driven, immune milieu, perhaps caused by certain types of immune stimulation early in life. This is followed by allergen exposure in a genetically susceptible individual.

Specific allergen exposure (e.g., dust mites) under the influence of helper T_{h}2 helper T cells leads to B-lymphocyte elaboration of immunoglobulin E (IgE) antibodies specific to that allergen. The IgE antibody attaches to surface receptors on the airway mucosal mast cells. One important question is whether atopic individuals with asthma, in contrast to atopic persons without asthma, have a defect in mucosal integrity that makes them susceptible to penetration of allergens into the mucosa.

Subsequent specific allergen exposure leads to cross-bridging of IgE molecules and activation of mast cells, with elaboration and release of a vast array of mediators. These mediators include histamine; leukotrienes C4, D4, and E4; and a host of cytokines. Together, these mediators cause bronchial smooth muscle constriction, vascular leakage, inflammatory cell recruitment (with further mediator release), and mucous gland secretion. These processes lead to airway obstruction by constriction of the smooth muscles, edema of the airways, influx of inflammatory cells, and formation of intraluminal mucus. In addition, ongoing airway inflammation is thought to cause airway hyperreactivity characteristic of asthma. The more severe the airway obstruction, the more likely ventilation-perfusion mismatching will result in impaired gas exchange and low levels of oxygen in the blood.

== Diagnosis ==
Severe acute asthma can be diagnosed by a primary care physician (PCP). A PCP will ask questions in regards to symptoms and breathing; they will also ask if fatigue or wheezing has been experienced when breathing in or out; and also test using a peak expiratory flow and an oxygen saturation.

Status asthmaticus can be misdiagnosed when wheezing occurs from an acute cause other than asthma. Some of these alternative causes of wheezing are discussed below.

=== Extrinsic compression ===
Airways can be compressed from vascular structures, such as vascular rings, lymphadenopathy, or tumors.

=== Congestive heart failure ===
Airway edema may cause wheezing in CHF. In addition, vascular compression may compress the airways during systole with cardiac ejection, resulting in a pulsatile wheeze that corresponds to the heart rate. This is sometimes erroneously referred to as cardiac asthma.

=== Differential diagnoses ===
- Allergic bronchopulmonary aspergillosis
- Aspiration syndromes
- Bronchiectasis
- Bronchiolitis
- Bronchiolitis obliterans
- Chronic bronchitis
- Chronic obstructive pulmonary disease (COPD)
- Eosinophilic granulomatosis with polyangiitis
- Croup
- Cystic fibrosis
- Emphysema
- Foreign bodies of the airway
- Gastroesophageal reflux disease
- Heart failure
- Idiopathic pulmonary arterial hypertension
- Inhalation injury
- Pulmonary artery sling
- Vocal cord dysfunction

== Treatment ==
Starting with first line treatments like inhalers the acute, short acting beta agonists and oxygen therapy then advance treatment include interventions like intravenous (IV) medications (e.g. magnesium sulfate), aerosolized medications to dilate the airways (bronchodilation) (e.g., albuterol or ipratropium bromide/salbutamol), and positive-pressure therapy, including mechanical ventilation. Multiple therapies may be used simultaneously to rapidly reverse the effects of status asthmaticus and reduce permanent damage of the airways. Intravenous corticosteroids and methylxanthines are often given. If the person with a severe asthma exacerbation is on a mechanical ventilator, certain sedating medications such as ketamine or propofol, have bronchodilating properties. According to a new randomized control trial ketamine and aminophylline are also effective in children with acute asthma who responds poorly to standard therapy.

== Recent research ==
A recent study proposed that the interaction between host airway epithelial cells and respiratory viruses is another aspect of innate immunity that is also a critical determination of asthma. It was also proposed that a rationale for how antiviral performance at the epithelial cell level might be improved to prevent acute infectious illness and chronic inflammatory disease caused by respiratory viruses.

Another study aimed to show that experimental asthma after viral infection inmate depended on Type I IFN-driven up-regulation of the high-affinity receptor for IgE (FcεRI) on conventional dendritic cells (cDCs) in the lungs. The study found that a Novell PMN-cDc interaction in the lung is necessary for a viral infection to induce atopic disease.

== Epidemiology ==
Status asthmaticus is slightly more common in males and is more common among people of African and Hispanic origin. The gene locus glutathione dependent S-nitrosoglutathione (GSNOR) has been suggested as one possible correlation to development of status asthmaticus.

== See also ==
- Status epilepticus
- Status angiotensus
