= Rapid shallow breathing index =

Medical index

The rapid shallow breathing index (RSBI) or Yang Tobin index is a tool that is used in the weaning of mechanical ventilation on intensive care units. The RSBI is defined as the ratio of respiratory frequency to tidal volume (f/VT). People on a ventilator who cannot tolerate independent breathing tend to breathe rapidly (high frequency) and shallowly (low tidal volume), and will therefore have a high RSBI. The index was introduced in 1991 by Karl Yang and Martin J. Tobin.

== Equation ==
$RSBI = \frac{f}{V_T}$

where

$f$ is the respiratory rate (breaths/minute)

$V_T$ is the tidal volume (liters)

== Measurement ==
In the original study, measurement was done with a handheld spirometer attached to the endotracheal tube while a patient breathes room air for one minute without any ventilator assistance. In contemporary ICUs, RSBI is often assessed while a patient is on Pressure Support Ventilation during a Spontaneous Breathing Trial.

== Example ==
As an example, a patient who has a respiratory rate of 25 breaths/min and an average tidal volume of 250 mL/breath has an RSBI = (25 breaths/min)/(0.25 L) = 100 breaths/min/L.

In contrast, the 'average' patient breathing 12 breaths/min, with a tidal volume of 420 mL/breath (70kg x 6 mL/kg) would have an RSBI = (12 breaths/min)/(.420 L) = 28 breaths/min/L.

The higher the RSBI, the more distressed the patient is generally considered to be.

== History ==
The concept was introduced in a 1991 paper by physicians Karl Yang and Martin J. Tobin from the University of Texas Health Science Center at Houston and Stritch School of Medicine at Loyola University in Chicago. It was a small single center trial that used 100 patients (n=36 derivation cohort, n=64 validation cohort).

== Weaning readiness ==
A RSBI score of less than 65 indicating a relatively low respiratory rate compared to tidal volume is generally considered as an indication of weaning readiness. A patient with a rapid shallow breathing index (RSBI) of less than 105 has an approximately 80% chance of being successfully extubated, whereas an RSBI of greater than 105 virtually guarantees weaning failure. Other criteria that have been suggested for a successful weaning trial include the ability to (1) tolerate a Spontaneous breathing trial for 30 minutes (in most patients, SBT failure will occur within approximately 20 minutes), (2) maintain a respiration rate of less than 35/min, and (3) keep an oxygen saturation of 90% without arrhythmias; sudden increases in heart rate and blood pressure; or development of respiratory distress, diaphoresis, or anxiety. Once the SBT is tolerated, the ability to clear secretions, a decreasing secretion burden, and a patent upper airway are other criteria that should be met to increase extubation success. Patients should be assessed daily for their readiness to be weaned from mechanical ventilation by withdrawing sedation and performing a spontaneous breathing trial.

== Limitations of RSBI ==
Although widely used as a measure of readiness to liberate from mechanical ventilation, RSBI has been criticized due to several limitations.

=== Lack of Specificity and Sensitivity ===
In a meta-analysis of 48 studies, RSBI had only moderate sensitivity (83%) and poor specificity (58%), suggesting that patients who are truly ready for extubation might be missed if RSBI alone is used and that a significant number of patients with "acceptable" RSBI values (<105) may still fail extubation.

=== Single-Point Measurement ===
RSBI is usually measured at a single time point, often after a short spontaneous breathing trial (SBT). This does not account for fatigue or changes over time, which can be crucial for weaning success.

=== Does Not Consider Work of Breathing ===
RSBI only assesses frequency and tidal volume, but ignores inspiratory effort and respiratory muscle workload. A patient with high work of breathing (e.g., using accessory muscles) might still have a normal RSBI.

=== Influence of Ventilator Settings and Support ===
Prior ventilator settings can significantly affect the RSBI. Several studies have found marked variations in RSBI when different ventilation strategies (PSV, CPAP, T-piece) were employed.

=== Poor Performance in Certain Patient Populations ===
COPD Patients: Chronic airflow limitation can lead to a misleading RSBI. Alternative thresholds (e.g. RSBI < 85) may perform better in people with COPD.

Neuromuscular Disease: These patients may have normal RSBI but still fail extubation due to poor cough or secretion clearance.

Obesity: Altered chest wall mechanics can make RSBI less predictive.

=== Influence of Anxiety and Psychological Factors ===
Patients who are anxious or in pain may have a temporarily elevated RSBI due to rapid breathing, even if they are otherwise ready to liberate from mechanical ventilation.
