= Biotrauma =

Severe inflammatory response in mechanical ventilator patients

Although the term has occasionally been used in other ways, in medical literature biotrauma is usually defined as a severe inflammatory response produced in the lungs of patients who breathe by means of a mechanical ventilator for a long period of time. The term was coined in a 1998 paper by L. N. Tremblay and A. S. Slutsky, titled Ventilator-induced injury: from barotrauma to biotrauma. The message of that paper was that barotrauma caused by pressure differentials is only one of several types of lung damage that a ventilator can produce.
