= Barotrauma =

Injury due to pressure difference between gas filled space and adjoining tissue

- Other names: Squeeze, decompression illness, lung overpressure injury, volutrauma
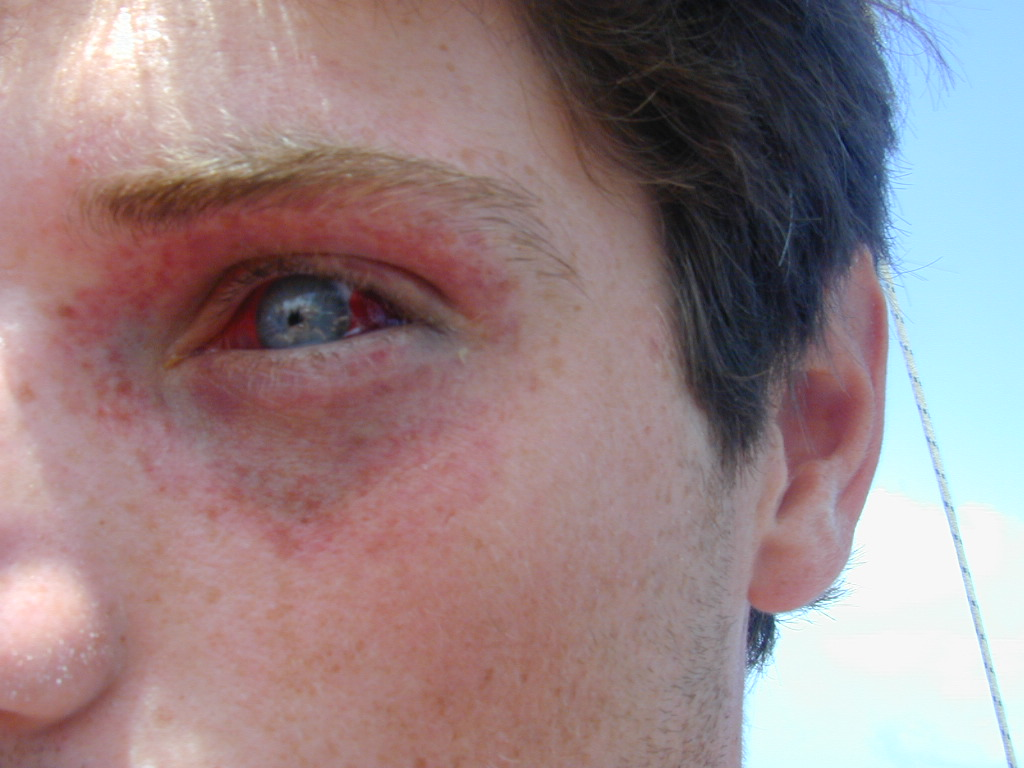
- Mild barotrauma to a diver caused by mask squeeze. Eye and surrounding skin show petechiae and a subconjunctival haemmorhage.
- Symptoms: Dependent on location
- Complications: Arterial gas embolism, pneumothorax, mediastinal emphysema
- Causes: Pressure difference between the environment and a gas-filled space in or in contact with the affected tissues

Barotrauma is physical damage to body tissues caused by a difference in pressure between a gas space inside, or in contact with, the body and the surrounding gas or liquid. The initial damage is usually due to over-stretching the tissues in tension or shear, either directly by an expansion of the gas in the closed space or by pressure difference hydrostatically transmitted through the tissue. Tissue rupture may be complicated by the introduction of gas into the local tissue or circulation through the initial trauma site, which can cause blockage of circulation at distant sites or interfere with the normal function of an organ by its presence. The term is usually applied when the gas volume involved already exists prior to decompression. Barotrauma can occur during both compression and decompression events.

Barotrauma generally manifests as sinus or middle ear effects, lung overpressure injuries and injuries resulting from external squeezes. Decompression sickness is indirectly caused by ambient pressure reduction, and tissue damage is caused directly and indirectly by gas bubbles. However, these bubbles form out of supersaturated solution from dissolved gases, and are not generally considered barotrauma. Decompression illness is a term that includes decompression sickness and arterial gas embolism caused by lung overexpansion barotrauma. It is also classified under the broader term of dysbarism, which covers all medical conditions resulting from changes in ambient pressure.

Barotrauma typically occurs when the organism is exposed to a significant change in ambient pressure, such as when a scuba diver, a free-diver or an airplane passenger ascends or descends or during uncontrolled decompression of a pressure vessel such as a diving chamber or pressurized aircraft, but can also be caused by a shock wave. Ventilator-induced lung injury (VILI) is a condition caused by over-expansion of the lungs by mechanical ventilation used when the body is unable to breathe for itself and is associated with relatively large tidal volumes and relatively high peak pressures. Barotrauma due to overexpansion of an internal gas-filled space may also be termed volutrauma.

== Presentation ==
Examples of organs or tissues easily damaged by barotrauma are:

- Middle ear and inner ear (barotitis or aerotitis)
- Paranasal sinuses (causing aerosinusitis)
- Lungs may be affected by both under-pressure or, more commonly, overpressure relative to the external pressure
- Eyes (the under-pressure air space is inside the diving mask or swimming goggles)
- Skin (when wearing a diving suit which creates an air space)
- Brain and cranium (temporal lobe injury secondary to temporal bone rupture)
- Teeth (causing barodontalgia, i.e., barometric pressure related dental pain, or dental fractures)
- Genital squeeze and associated urinary complications of P-valve use
- Intestinal barotrauma is caused by over-expansion of gas trapped in the intestines during ascent.

== Causes ==
When diving, the pressure differences which cause the barotrauma are changes in hydrostatic pressure. There are two components to the surrounding pressure acting on the diver: the atmospheric pressure and the water pressure. A descent of 10 metres (33 feet) in water increases the ambient pressure by an amount approximately equal to the pressure of the atmosphere at sea level. So, a descent from the surface to 10 metres (33 feet) underwater results in a doubling of the pressure on the diver. This pressure change will reduce the volume of a flexible gas-filled space by half. Boyle's law describes the relationship between the volume of the gas space and the pressure in the gas.

Barotraumas of descent, also known as compression barotrauma, and squeezes, are caused by preventing the free change of volume of the gas in a closed space in contact with the diver, resulting in a pressure difference between the tissues and the gas space, and the unbalanced force due to this pressure difference causes deformation of the tissues resulting in cell rupture. Barotraumas of ascent, also called decompression barotrauma, are also caused when the free change of volume of the gas in a closed space in contact with the diver is prevented. In this case the pressure difference causes a resultant tension in the surrounding tissues which exceeds their tensile strength.

Patients undergoing hyperbaric oxygen therapy must equalize their ears to avoid barotrauma. High risk of otic barotrauma is associated with unconscious patients. Explosive decompression of a hyperbaric environment can produce severe barotrauma, followed by severe decompression bubble formation and other related injury. The Byford Dolphin incident is an example. Rapid uncontrolled decompression from caissons, airlocks, pressurised aircraft, spacecraft, and pressure suits can have similar effects of decompression barotrauma.

Collapse of a pressure resistant structure such as a submarine, submersible, or atmospheric diving suit can cause rapid compression barotrauma. A rapid change of altitude can cause barotrauma when internal air spaces cannot be equalised. Excessively strenuous efforts to equalise the ears using the Valsalva manoeuvre can overpressurise the middle ear, and can cause middle ear and/or inner ear barotrauma. An explosive blast and explosive decompression create a pressure wave that can induce barotrauma. Such trauma may occur as part of a broader blast injury pattern when the pressure wave affects gas-containing organs. The difference in pressure between internal organs and the outer surface of the body causes injuries to internal organs that contain gas, such as the lungs, gastrointestinal tract, and ear. Lung injuries can also occur during rapid decompression, although the risk of injury is lower than with explosive decompression.

Mechanical ventilation can lead to barotrauma of the lungs. This can be due to either:

- absolute pressures used in order to ventilate non-compliant lungs.
- shearing forces, particularly associated with rapid changes in gas velocity.

The resultant alveolar rupture can lead to pneumothorax, pulmonary interstitial emphysema (PIE) and pneumomediastinum.

Barotrauma is a recognised complication of mechanical ventilation that can occur in any patient receiving mechanical ventilation, but is most commonly associated with acute respiratory distress syndrome. It used to be the most common complication of mechanical ventilation but can usually be avoided by limiting tidal volume and plateau pressure to less than 30 to 50 cm water column (30 to 50 mb). As an indicator of transalveolar pressure, which predicts alveolar distention, plateau pressure or peak airway pressure (PAP) may be the most effective predictor of risk, but there is no generally accepted safe pressure at which there is no risk. Risk also appears to be increased by aspiration of stomach contents and pre-existing disease such as necrotising pneumonia and chronic lung disease. Status asthmaticus is a particular problem as it requires relatively high pressures to overcome bronchial obstruction.

When lung tissues are damaged by alveolar over-distension, the injury may be termed volutrauma, but volume and transpulmonary pressure are closely related. Ventilator induced lung injury is often associated with high tidal volumes (V_{t}).

Other injuries with similar causes are decompression sickness and ebullism.

== Pathophysiology ==
=== Lung overpressure injury ===
A free-diver can dive and safely ascend without exhaling, because the gas in the lungs had been inhaled at atmospheric pressure, is compressed during the descent, and expands back to the original volume during ascent. A scuba or surface-supplied diver breathing gas at depth from underwater breathing apparatus fills their lungs with gas at an ambient pressure greater than atmospheric pressure. At 10 metres the lungs contain twice the amount of gas that they would contain at atmospheric pressure, and if they ascend without exhaling the gas will expand to match the decreasing pressure until the lungs reach their elastic limit, and begin to tear, and is very likely to sustain life-threatening lung damage. Besides tissue rupture, the overpressure may cause ingress of gases into the tissues through the ruptures, and further afield through the circulatory system. Pulmonary barotrauma (PBt) of ascent is also known as pulmonary over-inflation syndrome (POIS), lung over-pressure injury (LOP) and burst lung. Consequent injuries may include arterial gas embolism, pneumothorax, mediastinal, interstitial and subcutaneous emphysemas, depending on where the gas ends up, not usually all at the same time.

POIS may also be caused by mechanical ventilation.

=== Arterial gas embolism ===
Gas in the arterial system can be carried to the blood vessels of the brain and other vital organs. It typically causes transient embolism similar to thromboembolism but of shorter duration. Where damage occurs to the endothelium inflammation develops and symptoms resembling stroke may follow. The bubbles are generally distributed and of various sizes, and usually affect several areas, resulting in an unpredictable variety of neurological deficits. Unconsciousness or other major changes to the state of consciousness within about 10 minutes of surfacing are generally assumed to be gas embolism until proven otherwise. The belief that the gas bubbles themselves formed static emboli which remain in place until recompression has been superseded by the knowledge that the gas emboli are normally transient, and the damage is due to inflammation following endothelial damage and secondary injury from inflammatory mediator upregulation.

Hyperbaric oxygen can cause downregulation of the inflammatory response and resolution of oedema by causing hyperoxic arterial vasoconstriction of the supply to capillary beds. High concentration normobaric oxygen is appropriate as first aid but is not considered definitive treatment even when the symptoms appear to resolve. Relapses are common after discontinuing oxygen without recompression.

=== Pneumothorax ===
A pneumothorax is an abnormal collection of air in the pleural space between the lung and the chest wall. Symptoms typically include sudden onset of sharp, one-sided chest pain and shortness of breath. In a minority of cases, a one-way valve is formed by an area of damaged tissue, and the amount of air in the space between chest wall and lungs increases; this is called a tension pneumothorax. This can cause a steadily worsening oxygen shortage and low blood pressure. This leads to a type of shock called obstructive shock, which can be fatal unless reversed. Very rarely, both lungs may be affected by a pneumothorax. It is often called a "collapsed lung", although that term may also refer to atelectasis.

Divers who breathe from an underwater apparatus are supplied with breathing gas at ambient pressure, which results in their lungs containing gas at higher than atmospheric pressure. Divers breathing compressed air (such as when scuba diving) may develop a pneumothorax as a result of barotrauma from ascending just 1 metre (3 ft) while breath-holding with their lungs fully inflated. An additional problem in these cases is that those with other features of decompression sickness are typically treated in a diving chamber with hyperbaric therapy; this can lead to a small pneumothorax rapidly enlarging and causing features of tension.

Diagnosis of a pneumothorax by physical examination alone can be difficult (particularly in smaller pneumothoraces). A chest X-ray, computed tomography (CT) scan, or ultrasound is usually used to confirm its presence. Other conditions that can result in similar symptoms include a hemothorax (buildup of blood in the pleural space), pulmonary embolism, and heart attack. A large bulla may look similar on a chest X-ray.

=== Pneumomediastinum ===
Also known as mediastinal emphysema to divers, pneumomediastinum is a volume of gas inside the mediastinum, the central cavity in the chest between the lungs and surrounding the heart and central blood vessels, usually formed by gas escaping from the lungs as a result of lung rupture.

Gas bubbles escaping from a ruptured lung can travel along the outside of bronchioles and blood vessels until they reach the mediastinal cavity round the heart, major blood vessels, oesophagus and trachea. Gas trapped in the mediastinum expands as the diver continues to rise. The pressure of the trapped gas may cause intense pain inside the rib cage and in the shoulders, and the gas may compress the respiratory passageways, making breathing difficult, and collapse blood vessels. Symptoms range from pain under the sternum, shock, shallow breathing, unconsciousness, respiratory failure, and associated cyanosis. The gas will usually be absorbed by the body over time, and when the symptoms are mild, no treatment may be necessary. Otherwise it may be vented through a hypodermic needle inserted into the mediastinum. Recompression is not usually indicated.

== Diagnosis ==
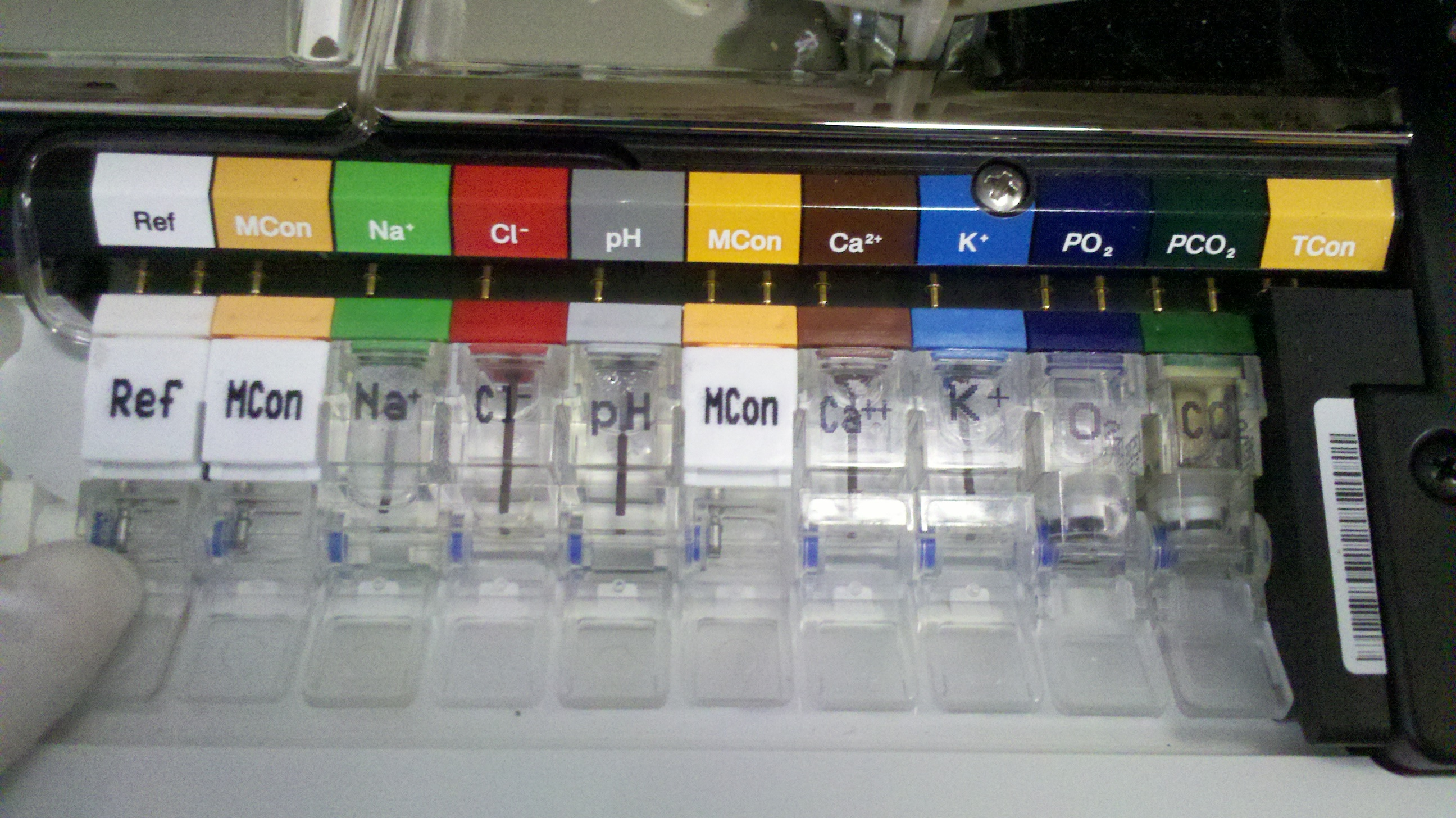
Blood gas analyser

Diagnosis of barotrauma generally involves a history of exposure to a source of pressure which could cause the injury suggested by the symptoms. This can vary from the immediately obvious if exposed to explosive blast, or mask squeeze, to rather complex discrimination between possibilities of inner ear decompression sickness and inner ear barotrauma, which may have nearly identical symptoms but different causative mechanism and mutually incompatible treatments. The detailed dive history may be necessary in these cases.

In terms of barotrauma the diagnostic workup for the affected individual could include the following:

Laboratory:

- Creatine kinase (CPK) level: Increases in CPK levels indicate tissue damage associated with decompression sickness.
- Complete blood count (CBC)
- Arterial blood gas (ABG) determination

Imaging:

- Chest radiography can show pneumothorax, and is indicated if there is chest discomfort or breathing difficulty
- Computed tomography (CT) scans and magnetic resonance imaging (MRI) may be indicated when there is severe headache or severe back pain after diving.
- CT is the most sensitive method to evaluate for pneumothorax. It can be used where barotrauma-related pneumothorax is suspected and chest radiograph findings are negative.
- Echocardiography can be used to detect the number and size of gas bubbles in the right side of the heart.

=== Ear barotrauma ===
Barotrauma can affect the external, middle, or inner ear. Middle ear barotrauma (MEBT) is the most common diving injury, being experienced by between 10% and 30% of divers and is due to insufficient equilibration of the middle ear. External ear barotrauma may occur if air is trapped in the external auditory canal. Diagnosis of middle and external ear barotrauma is relatively simple, as the damage is usually visible if severe enough to require intervention.

==== External auditory canal ====
Barotrauma can occur in the external auditory canal if it is blocked by cerumen, exostoses, a tight-fitting diving suit hood or earplugs, which create an airtight, air-filled space between the eardrum and the blockage. On descent, a pressure differential develops between the ambient water and the interior of this space, and this can cause swelling and haemorrhagic blistering of the canal. Treatment is usually analgesics and topical steroid eardrops. Complications may include local infection. This form of barotrauma is usually easily avoided.

==== Middle ear ====
Middle ear barotrauma (MEBT) is an injury caused by a difference in pressure between the external ear canal and the middle ear. It is common in underwater divers and usually occurs when the diver does not equalise sufficiently during descent or, less commonly, on ascent. Failure to equalise may be due to inexperience or eustachian tube dysfunction, which can have many possible causes. Unequalised ambient pressure increase during descent causes a pressure imbalance between the middle ear air space and the external auiditory canal over the eardrum, referred to by divers as ear squeeze, causing inward stretching, serous effusion and haemorrhage, and eventual rupture. During ascent internal over-pressure is normally passively released through the eustachian tube, but if this does not happen the volume expansion of middle ear gas will cause outward bulging, stretching and eventual rupture of the eardrum known to divers as reverse ear squeeze. This damage causes local pain and hearing loss. Tympanic rupture during a dive can allow water into the middle ear, which can cause severe vertigo from caloric stimulation. This may cause nausea and vomiting underwater, which has a high risk of aspiration of vomit or water, with possible fatal consequences.

==== Inner ear ====
Inner ear barotrauma (IEBt), though much less common than MEBT, shares a similar external cause. Mechanical trauma to the inner ear can lead to varying degrees of conductive and sensorineural hearing loss as well as vertigo. It is also common for conditions affecting the inner ear to result in auditory hypersensitivity. Two possible mechanisms are associated with forced Valsalva manoeuvre. In the one, the Eustachian tube opens in response to the pressure, and a sudden rush of high pressure air into the middle ear causes stapes footplate dislocation and inward rupture of the oval or round window. In the other, the tube remains closed and increased cerebrospinal fluid pressure is transmitted through the cochlea and causes outward rupture of the round window.

Inner ear barotrauma can be difficult to distinguish from Inner ear decompression sickness. Both conditions manifest as cochleovestibular symptoms. The similarity of symptoms makes differential diagnosis difficult, which can delay appropriate treatment or lead to inappropriate treatment.

Nitrogen narcosis, oxygen toxicity, hypercarbia, and hypoxia can cause disturbances in balance or vertigo, but these appear to be central nervous system effects, not directly related to effects on the vestibular organs. High-pressure nervous syndrome during heliox compression is also a central nervous system dysfunction. Inner ear injuries with lasting effects are usually due to round window ruptures, often associated with Valsalva maneuver or inadequate middle ear equalisation. Inner ear barotrauma is often concurrent with middle ear barotrauma as the external causes are generally the same. A variety of injuries may be present, which may include inner ear haemorrhage, intralabyrinthine membrane tear, perilymph fistula, and other pathologies.

Divers who develop cochlear and/or vestibular symptoms during descent to any depth, or during shallow diving in which decompression sickness is unlikely, should be treated with bed rest with head elevation, and should avoid any activity which could cause raised cerebrospinal fluid and intralabyrinthine pressure. If there is no improvement in symptoms after 48 hours, exploratory tympanotomy may be considered to investigate possible repair of a labyrinthine window fistula. Recompression therapy is contraindicated in these cases, but is the definitive treatment for inner ear decompression sickness, making an early and accurate differential diagnosis important for deciding on appropriate treatment. IEBt in divers may be difficult to distinguish from inner ear decompression sickness (IEDCS), and as a dive profile alone cannot always eliminate either of the possibilities, the detailed dive history may be necessary to diagnose the more likely injury. It is also possible for both to occur at the same time, and IEDCS is more likely to affect the semicircular canals, causing severe vertigo, while IEBt is more likely to affect the cochlea, causing hearing loss, but these are just statistical probabilities, and in reality it can go either way or both. It is accepted practice to assume that if any symptom typical of DCS is present, that the diver has DCS and will be treated accordingly with recompression. Limited case data suggest that recompression does not usually cause harm if the differential diagnosis between IEBt vs IEDCS is doubtful.

Symptom comparison between inner ear barotrauma and inner ear decompression sickness
Barotrauma	Decompression sickness
Conductive or mixed hearing loss	Sensorineural hearing loss
Occurs during descent or ascent	Onset during ascent or after surfacing
Cochlear symptoms (i.e. hearing loss) predominate	Vestibular symptoms (vertigo) predominant; right sided
History of difficult ear clearing or forced Valsalva manoeuvre	No history of eustachian tube dysfunction
Low-risk dive profile	Depth >15 m, helium mixtures, helium to nitrogen gas switches, repetitive dives
Isolated inner ear symptoms, or inner and middle ear on the same sides	Other neurological or dermatological symptoms suggestive of DCS

=== Barosinusitis ===
The sinuses, like other air-filled cavities, are susceptible to barotrauma if their openings become obstructed. This can result in pain as well as epistaxis (nosebleed). Diagnosis is usually simple provided the history of pressure exposure is mentioned. Barosinusitis, is also called aerosinusitis, sinus squeeze or sinus barotrauma. Sinus barotrauma can be caused by external or internal overpressure. External over-pressure is called sinus squeeze by divers, while internal over-pressure is usually referred to as reverse block or reverse squeeze.

=== Mask squeeze ===
If a diver's mask is not equalized during descent the relative negative internal pressure can produce petechial hemorrhages in the area covered by the mask along with subconjunctival hemorrhages.

=== Helmet squeeze ===
A problem mostly of historical interest, but still relevant to surface supplied divers who dive with the helmet sealed to the dry suit. If the air supply hose is ruptured near or above the surface, the pressure difference between the water around the diver and the air in the hose can be several bar. The non-return valve at the connection to the helmet will prevent backflow if it is working correctly, but if absent, as in the early days of helmet diving, or if it fails, the pressure difference will tend to squeeze the diver into the rigid helmet, which can result in severe trauma. The same effect can result from a large and rapid increase in depth if the air supply is insufficient to keep up with the increase in ambient pressure. On a helmet with a neck dam, the neck dam will allow water to flood the helmet before serious barotrauma can occur. This can happen with helium reclaim helmets if the reclaim regulator system fails, so there is a manual bypass valve, which allows the helmet to be purged so breathing can continue on open circuit.

=== Pulmonary barotrauma ===
Lung over-pressure injury in ambient pressure divers using underwater breathing apparatus is usually caused by breath-holding on ascent. The compressed gas in the lungs expands as the ambient pressure decreases causing the lungs to over-expand and rupture unless the diver allows the gas to escape by maintaining an open airway, as in normal breathing. The lungs do not sense pain when over-expanded giving the diver little warning to prevent the injury. This does not affect breath-hold divers as they bring a lungful of air with them from the surface, which merely re-expands safely to near its original volume on ascent. The problem only arises if a breath of ambient pressure gas is taken at depth, which may then expand on ascent to more than the lung volume. Pulmonary barotrauma may also be caused by explosive decompression of a pressurised aircraft, as occurred on 1 February 2003 to the crew in the Space Shuttle Columbia disaster.

== Prevention ==
=== Diving ===
Barotrauma may be caused when diving, either from being crushed, or squeezed, on descent or by stretching and bursting on ascent; both can be avoided by equalising the pressures. A negative, unbalanced pressure is known as a squeeze, crushing eardrums, dry suit, lungs or mask inwards and can be equalised by putting air into the squeezed space. A positive unbalanced pressure expands internal spaces rupturing tissue and can be equalised by letting air out, for example by exhaling. Both may cause barotrauma. There are a variety of techniques depending on the affected area and whether the pressure inequality is a squeeze or an expansion:

- Ears and sinuses: There is a risk of stretched or burst eardrums, usually crushed inwards during descent but sometimes stretched outwards on ascent. The diver can use a variety of methods to let air into or out of the middle ears via the Eustachian tubes. Sometimes swallowing will open the Eustachian tubes and equalise the ears.
- Lungs: There is a risk of pneumothorax, arterial gas embolism, and mediastinal and subcutaneous emphysema during ascent, which are commonly called burst lung or lung overpressure injury by divers. To equalise the lungs, all that is necessary is not to hold the breath during ascent. This risk does not occur when breath-hold diving from the surface, unless the diver breathes from an ambient pressure gas source underwater; breath-hold divers do suffer squeezed lungs on descent, crushing in the chest cavity, but, while uncomfortable, this rarely causes lung injury and returns to normal at the surface. Some people have pathology of the lung which prevent rapid flow of excess air through the passages, which can lead to lung barotrauma even if the breath is not held during rapid depressurisation. These people should not dive as the risk is unacceptably high. Most commercial or military diving medical examinations will look specifically for signs of this pathology.
- Diving mask squeeze enclosing the eyes and nose: The main risk is rupture of the capillaries of the eyes and facial skin because of the negative pressure difference between the gas space and blood pressure, or orbital emphysema from higher pressures. This can be avoided by breathing air into the mask through the nose. Goggles covering only the eyes are not suitable for deep diving as they cannot be equalised.
- Dry suit squeeze. The main risk is skin getting pinched and bruised by folds of the dry suit when squeezed on descent. Most dry suits can be equalised against squeeze via a manually operated valve fed from a low pressure gas supply. Air must be manually injected during the descent to avoid squeeze and is manually or automatically vented on the ascent to maintain buoyancy control.
- Diving helmet squeeze: Helmet squeeze will occur if the gas supply hose is severed above the diver and the non-return valve at the helmet gas inlet fails or is not fitted. Severity will depend on the hydrostatic pressure difference. A very rapid descent, usually by accident, may exceed the rate at which the breathing gas supply can equalise the pressure causing a temporary squeeze. The introduction of the non-return valve and high maximum gas supply flow rates have all but eliminated both these risks. In helmets fitted with a neck dam, the dam will admit water into the helmet if the internal pressure gets too low; this is less of a problem than helmet squeeze but the diver may drown if the gas supply is not reinstated quickly. This form of barotrauma is avoidable by controlled descent rate, which is standard practice for commercial divers, who will use shotlines, diving stages and wet bells to control descent and ascent rates.

==== Medical screening ====
Professional divers are screened for risk factors during initial and periodical medical examination for fitness to dive. In most cases recreational divers are not medically screened, but are required to provide a medical statement before acceptance for training in which the most common and easy to identify risk factors must be declared. If these factors are declared, the diver may be required to be examined by a medical practitioner, and may be disqualified from diving if the conditions indicate.

Asthma, Marfan syndrome, and COPD pose a very high risk of pneumothorax. In some countries these may be considered absolute contraindications, while in others the severity may be taken into consideration. Asthmatics with a mild and well controlled condition may be permitted to dive under restricted circumstances.

==== Training ====
A significant part of entry level diver training is focused on understanding the risks and procedural avoidance of barotrauma. Professional divers and recreational divers with rescue training are trained in the basic skills of recognizing and first aid management of diving barotrauma.

=== Mechanical ventilation ===
Isolated mechanical forces may not adequately explain ventilator induced lung injury (VILI). The damage is affected by the interaction of these forces and the pre-existing state of the lung tissues, and dynamic changes in alveolar structure may be involved. Factors such as plateau pressure and positive end-expiratory pressure (PEEP) alone do not adequately predict injury. Cyclic deformation of lung tissue may play a large part in the cause of VILI, and contributory factors probably include tidal volume, positive end-expiratory pressure and respiratory rate. There is no protocol guaranteed to avoid all risk in all applications.

=== Aviation and spaceflight ===
Barotrauma caused during airplane journeys is also referred to as airplane ear. The environmental pressure must be prevented from changing rapidly by large amounts. One should include multiple redundant levels of protection against rapid decompression, and systems allowing non-catastrophic failure with sufficient time to allow comfortable equalization of relevant air spaces, particularly the inner ear. A low internal pressure reduces decompression rate and severity in a catastrophic decompression reduces the risk of barotrauma but can increase the risk of decompression sickness and hypoxia in normal operating conditions.

Some measures for protection against rapid decompression specific to airplanes include:

1. Yawn and swallow during ascent and descent
2. Use the Valsalva maneuver during ascent and descent
3. Avoid sleeping during takeoffs and landings
4. Use an over the counter nasal spray
5. Using filtered earplugs which slowly equalize the pressure against the eardrum during ascents and descents

Outside of a pressurized cabin environment at very high altitudes, a pressure suit is the usual protective measure and is the definitive protection in decompression and exposure to vacuum, but they are expensive, heavy, bulky, restrict mobility, cause thermal regulatory problems, and reduce comfort. To prevent injury from unavoidable pressure changes, similar equalization techniques and relatively slow pressure changes are required, which in turn require patent Eustachian tubes and sinuses.

== Treatment ==
Treatment of diving barotrauma depends on the symptoms, which depend on the affected tissues. Lung over-pressure injury may require a chest drain to remove air from the pleura or mediastinum. Recompression with hyperbaric oxygen therapy is the definitive treatment for arterial gas embolism, as the raised pressure reduces bubble size, the reduced blood inert gas concentration may accelerate inert gas solution, and high oxygen partial pressure helps oxygenate tissues compromised by the emboli. Care must be taken when recompressing to avoid a tension pneumothorax. Barotraumas that do not involve gas in the tissues are generally treated according to severity and symptoms for similar trauma from other causes.

=== First aid ===
Pre-hospital care for lung barotrauma includes basic life support of maintaining adequate oxygenation and perfusion, assessment of airway, breathing and circulation, neurological assessment, and managing any immediate life-threatening conditions. High-flow oxygen up to 100% is considered appropriate for diving accidents. Large-bore venous access with isotonic fluid infusion is recommended to maintain blood pressure and pulse.

=== Emergency treatment ===
Pulmonary barotrauma:

- Endotracheal intubation may be required if the airway is unstable or hypoxia persists when breathing 100% oxygen.
- Needle decompression or tube thoracostomy may be necessary to drain a pneumothorax or haemothorax
- Foley catheterization may be necessary for spinal cord AGE if the person is unable to urinate.
- Intravenous hydration may be required to maintain adequate blood pressure.
- Therapeutic recompression is indicated for severe AGE. The diving medical practitioner will need to know the vital signs and relevant symptoms, along with the recent pressure exposure and breathing gas history of the patient. Air transport should be below 1,000 feet (300 m) if possible, or in a pressurized aircraft which should be pressurised to as low an altitude as reasonably possible.

Sinus squeeze and middle ear squeeze are generally treated with decongestants to reduce the pressure differential, with anti-inflammatory medications to treat the pain. For severe pain, narcotic analgesics may be appropriate.

Suit, helmet and mask squeeze are treated as trauma according to symptoms and severity.

=== Medication ===
The primary medications for lung barotrauma are hyperbaric and normobaric oxygen, hyperbaric heliox or nitrox, isotonic fluids, anti-inflammatory medications, decongestants, and analgesics.

=== Outcomes ===
Following barotrauma of the ears or lungs from diving the diver should not dive again until cleared by a diving doctor. After ear injury examination will include a hearing test and a demonstration that the middle ear can be autoinflated. Recovery can take weeks to months.

== Epidemiology ==
An estimate of in the order of 1000 dive injuries per year occur in the United States and Canada. Many of these involve barotrauma, with nearly 50% of reported injuries involving middle ear barotrauma. Diving injuries tend to correlate with trait anxiety and a tendency to panic, lack of experience, advancing age and reduction in fitness, alcohol usage, obesity, asthma, chronic sinusitis and otitis.

== Barotrauma in other animals ==
Whales and dolphins develop severely disabling barotrauma when exposed to excessive pressure changes induced by navy sonar, oil industry airguns, explosives, undersea earthquakes and volcanic eruptions. Injury and mortality of fish, marine mammals, including sea otters, seals, dolphins and whales, and birds by underwater explosions has been recorded in several studies.

It has been claimed that bats can suffer fatal barotrauma in the low pressure zones behind the blades of wind turbines due to their more fragile mammalian lung structure in comparison with the more robust avian lungs, which are less affected by pressure change. The claims that have been made that bats can be killed by lung barotrauma when flying in low-pressure regions close to operating wind-turbine blades, have been supported by reports of measurements of the pressures around the turbine blades. The diagnosis and contribution of barotrauma to bat deaths near wind turbine blades have been disputed by other research comparing dead bats found near wind turbines with bats killed by impact with buildings in areas with no turbines.

=== Swim bladder overexpansion ===
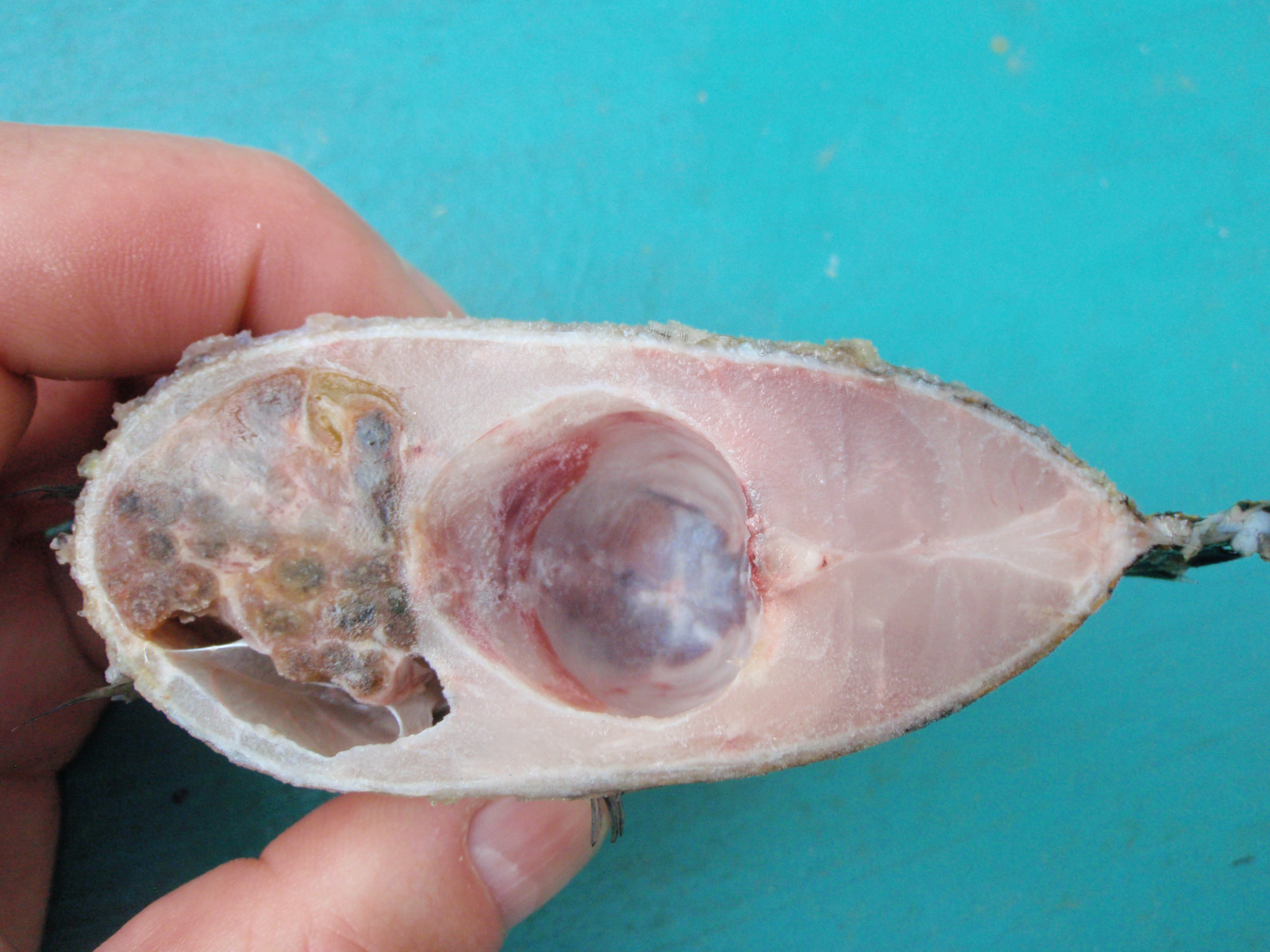
Barotrauma injury to tiger angelfish – head end. Note distended swim bladder (centre) and gas space in abdominal cavity (left)

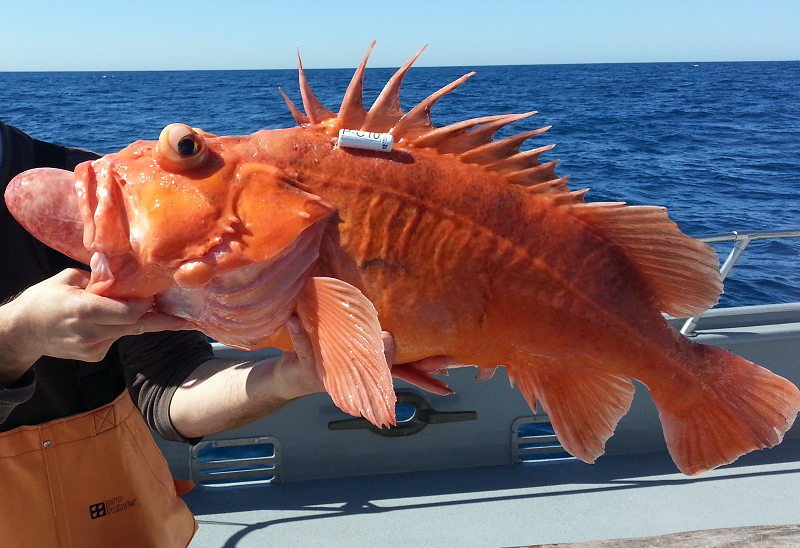
A Cowcod rockfish (Sebastes levis) experiencing severe barotrauma. Note the bulging eyes and stomach, which has expanded out of the mouth to look like a tongue. Courtesy of NOAA fisheries

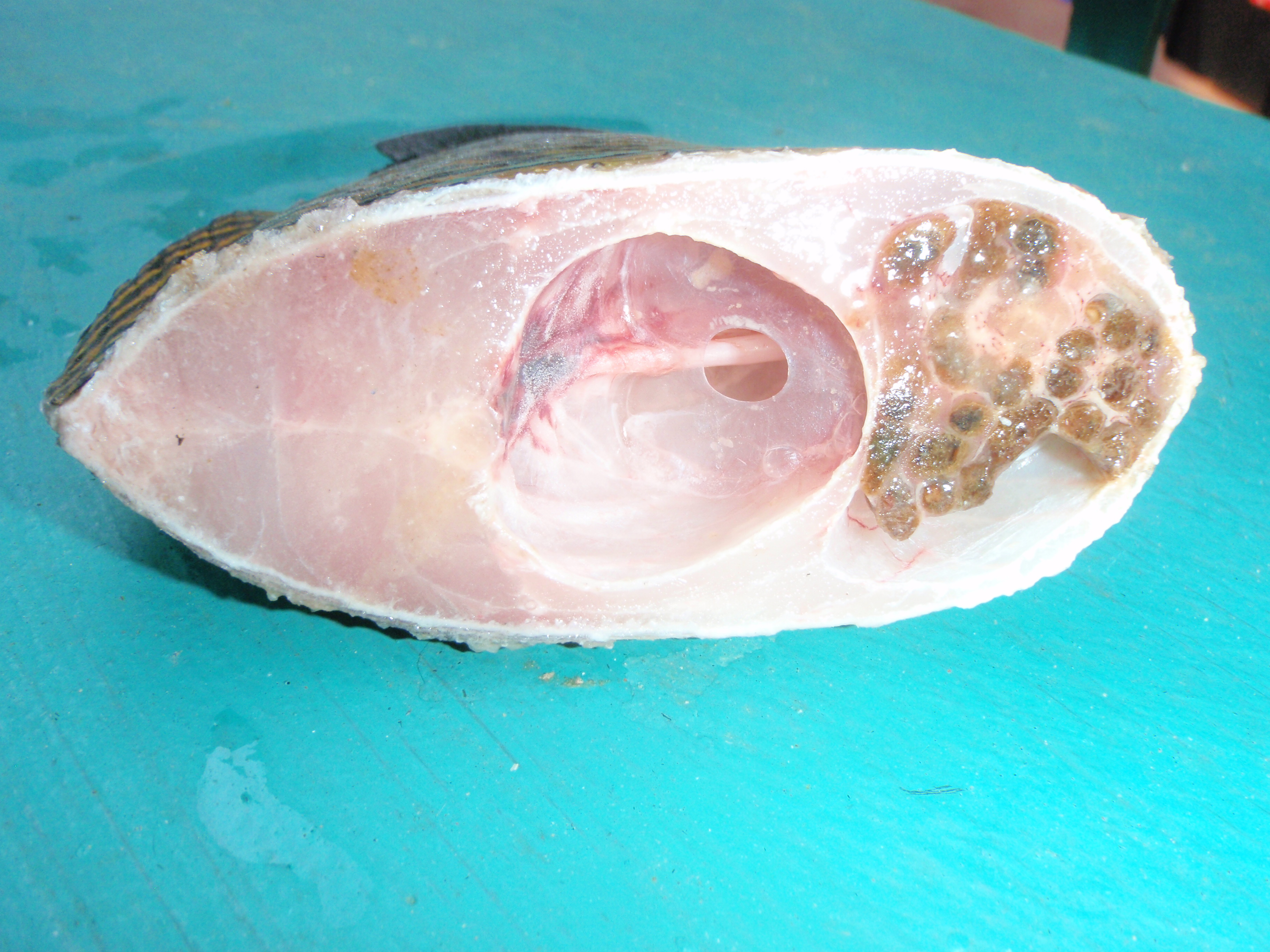
Barotrauma injury to tiger angelfish – tail end

Fish with isolated swim bladders are susceptible to barotrauma of ascent when brought to the surface by fishing. The swim bladder is an organ of buoyancy control which is filled with gas extracted from solution in the blood, and which is normally removed by the reverse process. If the fish is brought upwards in the water column faster than the gas can be resorbed, the gas will expand until the bladder is stretched to its elastic limit, and may rupture. Barotrauma can be directly fatal or disable the fish rendering it vulnerable to predation, but rockfish are able to recover if they are returned to depths similar to those they were pulled up from, shortly after surfacing. Scientists at NOAA developed the "Seaqualizer," as well as other descending devices, to quickly return rockfish to depth. The device could increase survival in caught-and-released bottom fish. Notable, anglers fishing for vulnerable game fish species like red snapper (Lutjanus campechanus) and rockfish (genus Sebastes) are required to possess a descending device while angling.

== See also ==
- Alternobaric vertigo – Dizziness resulting from unequal pressures in the middle ears
- Atelectotrauma – Damage caused to the lung by mechanical ventilation
- Barodontalgia – Tooth pain caused by ambient pressure change
- Diving hazards and precautions – Hazards associated with underwater diving
- Dysbarism – Medical conditions resulting from changes in ambient pressure
- Decompression sickness – Disorder caused by dissolved gases forming bubbles in tissues
- Inner ear decompression sickness – Medical condition caused by inert gas bubbles forming out of solution
- Modes of mechanical ventilation
- Rheotrauma – Complication of mechanical ventilation
- Weather pains, also known as Meteoropathy – Pain allegedly caused by weather changes
- Uncontrolled decompression – Unplanned drop in the pressure of a sealed system
