= Shortages related to the COVID-19 pandemic =

Aspect of viral disease pandemic

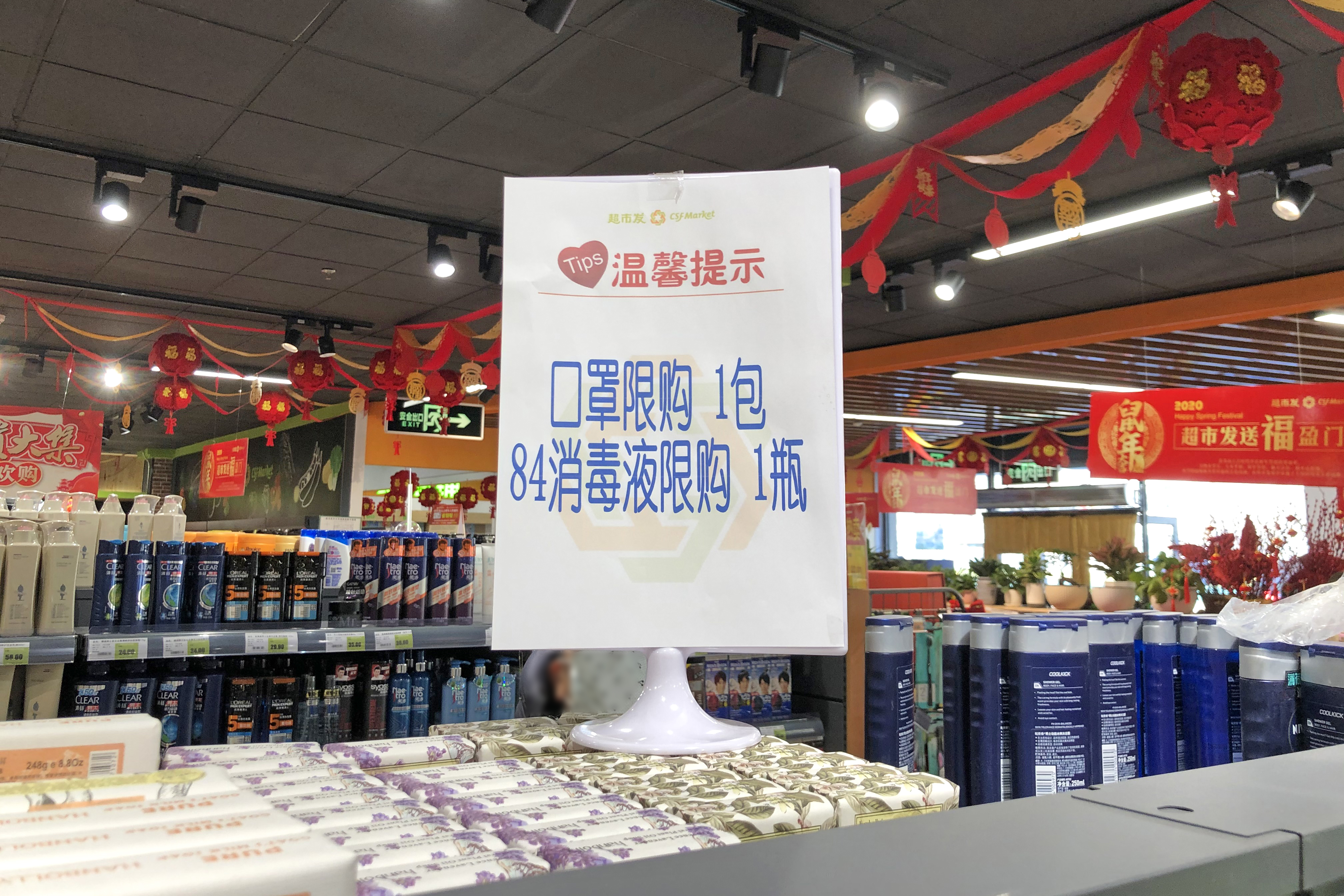
Surgical and N95 masks shortages were critical during the early pandemic, resulting in purchase quota, non-availability, lower-than-required protections and tarmac airport bidding wars. Here a supermarket in Beijing imposes daily buying limits on surgical masks and disinfectant liquid

The landscape of shortages changed dramatically over the course of the COVID-19 pandemic. Initially, extreme shortages emerged in the equipment needed to protect healthcare workers, diagnostic testing, equipment and staffing to provide care to seriously ill patients, and basic consumer goods disrupted by panic buying. Many commercial and governmental operations curtailed or suspended operations, leading to shortages across "non-essential" services. For example, many health care providers stopped providing some surgeries, screenings, and oncology treatments. In some cases, governmental decision making created shortages, such as when the CDC prohibited the use of any diagnostic test other than the one it created. One response was to improvise around shortages, producing supplies ranging from cloth masks to diagnostic tests to ventilators in home workshops, university laboratories, and rapidly repurposed factories.

As these initial shortages were gradually remedied throughout 2020/2021, a second group of shortages emerged, afflicting industries dependent on global supply chains, affecting everything from automobiles to semiconductors to home appliances, in part due to China's determination to eliminate COVID-19 from its population by enforcing stringent quarantines and shutdowns, in part by disruptions to goods distribution, and in part by forecasting errors.

Shortages were concentrated in America, Europe, Latin America, and China, while other jurisdictions were much less affected, for a variety of reasons.

== Background ==
Historically, governments were the primary source of supplies for pandemics. Their willingness to maintain large stocks has tended to vary with the severity of the most recent pandemic. For example, in the early 2000s, President George W. Bush increased US pandemic stockpiles. These were depleted in the 2009 swine flu pandemic. The pandemic was seen by the public as mild, which led to a backlash over preparedness spending. National stockpiles of medical equipment were not systematically renewed, in the US or in jurisdictions such as France, which in 2013 moved responsibility for personal protective equipment (PPE) stockpiles to public and private enterprises. The French strategic stockpile dropped from one billion surgical masks and 600 million FFP2 masks in 2010 to 150 million and zero, respectively, in early 2020.

Manufacturing for many types of health-related equipment had moved offshore, seeking lower costs. American mask manufacturer Prestige Ameritech warned for years that the USA mask supply chain was too dependent on China.

Public (World Health Organization (WHO), World Bank, Global Preparedness Monitoring Board) and private initiatives emphasized pandemic threats and preparation. In 2015, Bill Gates began warning about a possible pandemic. This had little impact: WHO's pandemic influenza preparedness project had a US$39 million two-year budget, out of WHO's 2020–2021 budget of US$4.8 billion.

In 2018, China experienced a shortage of emergency drugs. In 2019, the Global Preparedness Monitoring Board reported the WHO's remaining pandemic emergency fund was depleted by the 2018–19 Kivu Ebola pandemics.

As COVID-19 spread in January 2020, China began blocking exports of various medical supplies, including N95 masks, booties, and gloves produced by factories on its territory. Organisations close to the Chinese government began foreign markets for supplies. This limited other countries' access.

== Tests ==
Initial testing shortages were a key factor limiting authorities' ability to measure disease spread. Because the virus was new, tests had to be designed, manufactured, distributed, administered, and evaluated from a standing start. The ability to do this varied dramatically across jurisdictions. Germany started producing and stockpiling COVID-19 tests in January 2020.

The United States Centers for Disease Control and Prevention (CDC) initially demanded that universities and other researchers abandon their attempts to make diagnostic PCR tests in favor of waiting for the CDC to release its own tests. The CDC then distributed 160,000 defective tests, leaving the US with no testing capacity in the early weeks of the pandemic. By February 27, fewer than 4,000 tests had been conducted in the U.S. CDC released a corrected test in March 2020. By then the pandemic had spread across the country. The Associated Press reported that "the system has been marked by inconsistencies, delays, and shortages", forcing many people with symptoms to wait hours or days to get tested and then days longer to receive the results.

Many countries did not have the ability to implement large-scale testing, lacking both tests and the health care infrastructure to administer and evaluate them.

=== Reagents ===
In Ireland and the United Kingdom (UK), reagent shortages limited the number of tests evaluated through March and April. Reagent shortages became a bottleneck for mass testing in the European Union (EU).

On 1 April, the UK government confirmed that 2,000 NHS staff had been tested for coronavirus since the outbreak began, but Cabinet Office Minister Michael Gove said a shortage of reagents meant it was not possible to screen the NHS's 1.2 million workforce. Gove's statement was contradicted by the Chemical Industries Association, which denied any shortage.

Some US hospitals manufactured their own reagents from publicly-available recipes.

=== Swabs ===
The US Strategic National Stockpile held no swabs, forcing reliance on commercial supplies, which were soon exhausted by the explosive growth in testing. The US had shortages, despite the fact that one domestic manufacturer increased production to 1 million swabs per day in March, and the government funded it to build a new factory in May. Shortages arose in the UK, but were resolved by 2 April.

In May 2020, the US FDA licensed a swab-free saliva test and new swab designs, including 3-D printed swabs that labs, hospitals, and other medical facilities could make themselves. The development process took as little as two weeks.

== Personal protective equipment ==
Personal protective equipment (PPE) stocks ran out around the world in the winter of 2020. People from 86 countries engaged in the voluntary production of PPE to supplement disrupted supply chains. By summer 2021, shortages had turned to glut, as many manufacturers reduced production.

=== China ===
California Governor Gavin Newsom speaks about PPE shortages and purchases in May 2020.

Before the pandemic, most PPE was made in China. The Chinese government took control of stocks from foreign enterprises whose factories produced these goods. At the outset, China imported some 2.46 billion pieces of PPE between 24 January and 29 February, including 2.02 billion masks and 25.38 million items of protective clothing.

In February 2020 WHO minimised the need for PPE, recommending telemedicine; physical barriers such as clear windows; isolating patients; using only PPE necessary for each specific task; reusing respirators without removing them while caring for multiple patients with the same diagnosis; monitoring and coordinating supply chains; and discouraging masking for asymptomatic individuals.

China later sent supplies to Spain, Turkey, and the Netherlands that were of poor quality. The Dutch health ministry recalled 600,000 face masks on 21 March for poor fit and dysfunctional filters despite them having a quality certificate. The Spanish government discovered that 60,000 out of 340,000 test kits from a Chinese manufacturer produced inaccurate results. The Chinese Ministry of Foreign Affairs responded that the customer should "double-check the instructions to make sure that you ordered, paid for and distributed the right ones. Do not use non-surgical masks for surgical purposes". In mid-May, the European Commission suspended an order of 10 million Chinese masks after two countries reported receiving sub-standard products. After a batch of 1.5 million masks was distributed, Poland said the 600,000 items they received had no European certificates nor did they comply with the necessary standard.

=== Hand sanitiser ===
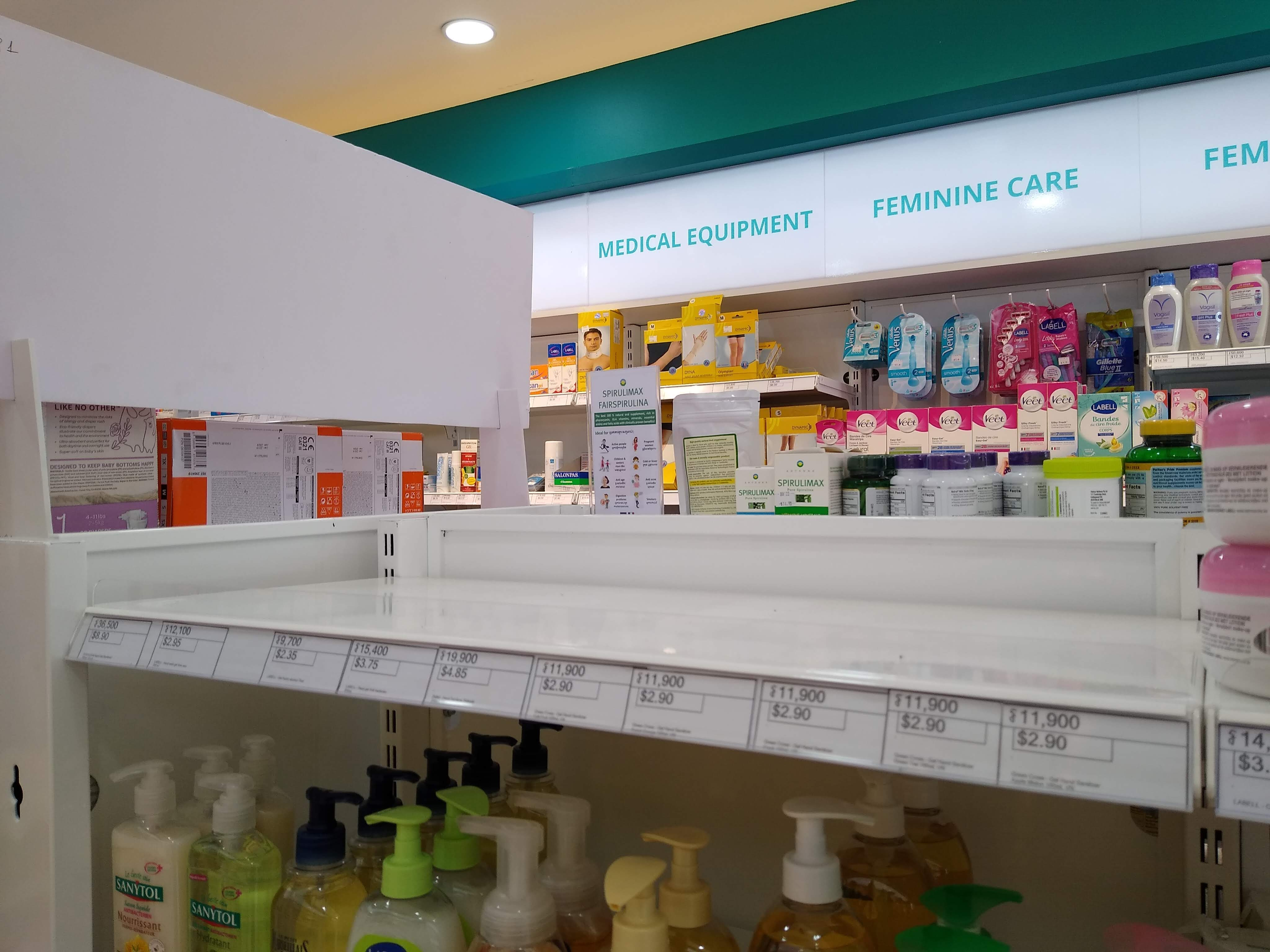
An empty hand sanitiser shelf at a pharmacy in Kep, Cambodia, the day after the first reported COVID-19 case in the country

Hand sanitiser went out of stock in many areas, causing high prices. In response, brewers and distillers began to produce hand sanitizer.

=== Protective gear ===
Initial shortages were such that some nurses at one New York City hospital resorted to wearing garbage bags as an alternative to unavailable protective clothing. Small businesses throughout the United States retooled to produce makeshift protective devices, often through open source initiatives. Many manufacturers donated gear. An example is the COVID-19 Intubation Safety Box, which is an acrylic cube placed over an infected patient's torso, with openings that allow ventilator intubation and extubation while minimising risk to healthcare workers.

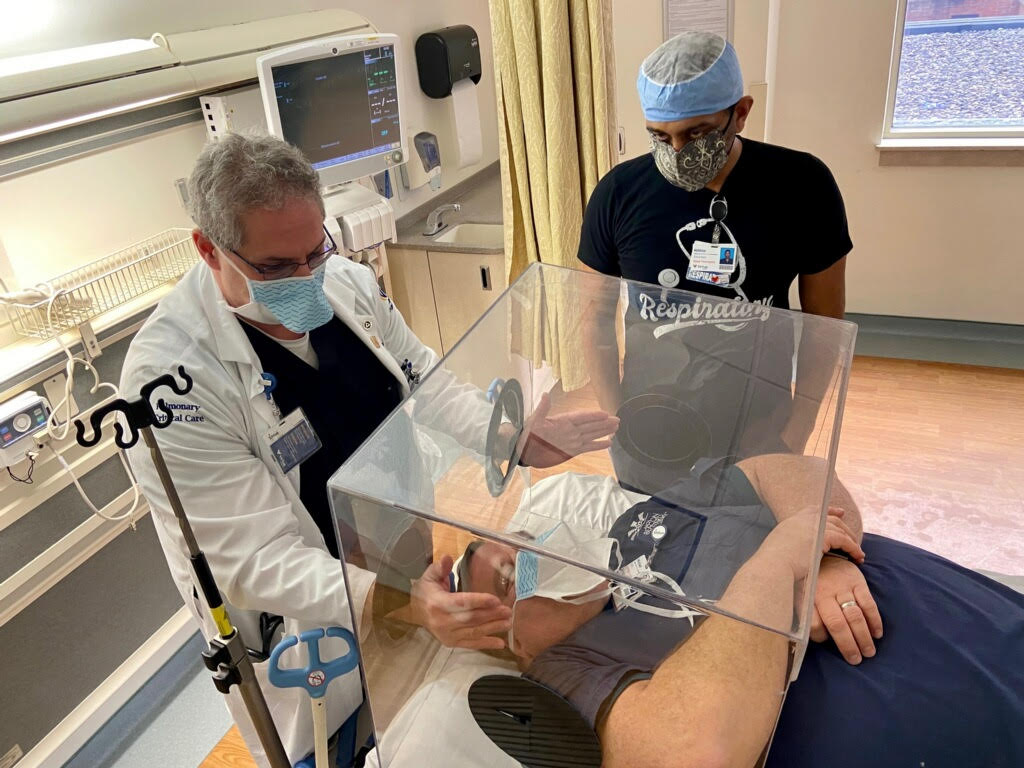
Plexiglass box to screen patients during intubation

Amazon banned sales of N95 face masks to prevent price gouging.

In March 2020, Doctors' Association UK alleged that shortages were covered up through intimidating emails, threats of disciplinary action and work suspensions. Some doctors were disciplined by managers annoyed by online postings online regarding shortages. On 18 April, communities secretary Robert Jenrick reported that 400,000 protective gowns and other PPE were on their way to the U.K. from Turkey. One day later, these were delayed, leading hospital leaders to criticise the government for the first time. Only 32,000 items arrived (less than one-tenth). Eventually, all were returned to Turkey for failure to meet NHS standards.

Most of the world's glove supply comes from Malaysia; Large orders with trusted companies were typically made "years in advance". Malaysia-based Top Glove and its subsidiary TG Medical were accused of violations of workers' rights, leading U.S. Customs and Border Protection (CBP) to ban their products in July 2020. Thai company Paddy the Room repackaged used gloves and sold tens of millions to U.S. buyers in 2021.

=== Masks ===
==== China ====
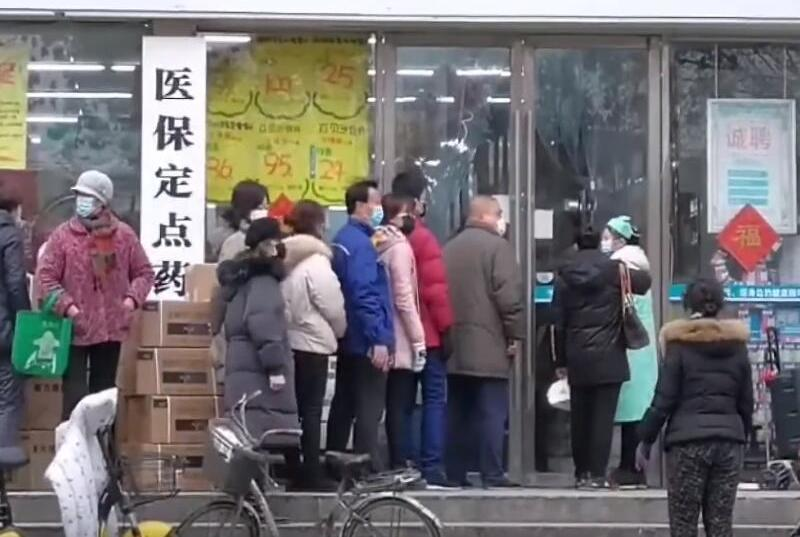
People in Wuhan lining up in front of a store to buy medical supplies

As the pandemic accelerated, the mainland market saw a shortage of face masks. Hoarding and price gouging drove up prices, leading the market regulator to crack down. In January 2020, price controls were imposed on face masks on Taobao, Tmall JD.com, Suning.com, and Pinduoduo; third-party vendors were subject to price caps, and violators to sanctions.

==== United States ====
In 2006, 156 million masks were added to the U.S. Strategic National Stockpile in anticipation of a flu pandemic. After they were used against the 2009 flu pandemic, neither the Obama administration nor the Trump administration replenished the stocks. By 1 April, the US stockpile was nearly empty.

National Nurses United, the largest organization of registered nurses in the United States, filed over 125 complaints with Occupational Safety and Health Administration (OSHA) offices charging hospitals with failing to comply with laws mandating safe workplaces.

==== France ====
In 2010, France's stock included 1 billion surgical masks and 600 million FFP2 masks; in early 2020 it had fallen 150 million and zero, respectively. As the pandemic consumed supplies, stocks ran low and caused national outrage. France instructed its remaining mask-producing factories to work 24/7 shifts, and to expand national production to 40 million masks per month.

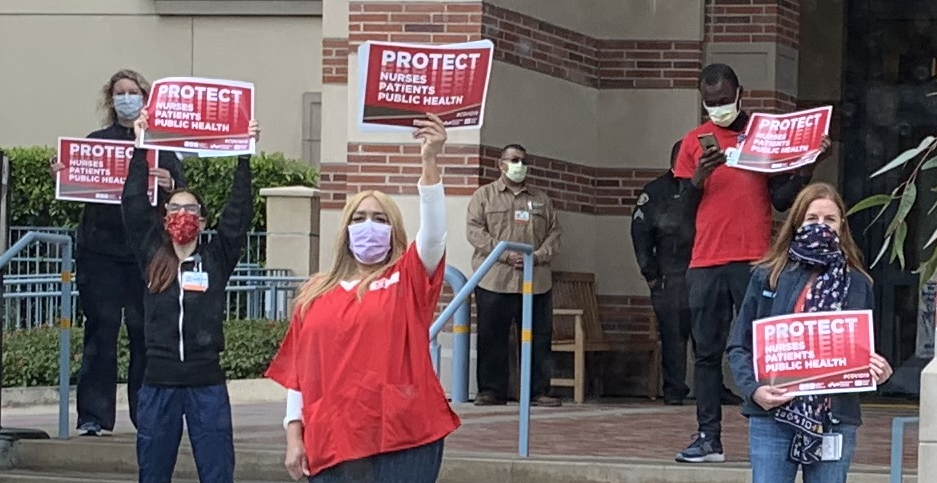
13 April 2020. Outside UCLA Medical Center, Santa Monica. NNU nurses protest lack of N-95 masks & other protective equipment.

==== Competition for supplies ====
Countries such as the United Kingdom, France, Germany, South Korea, Taiwan, China, India, and others initially responded to the outbreak by limiting or banning exports of medical supplies, including rescinding existing orders. Germany blocked exports of 240,000 masks bound for Switzerland and stopped other shipments to Czechia. Turkey blocked a shipment of ventilators to Spain; 116 were later released.

Governments began competing with each other to obtain medical supplies, either through paying higher prices or seizing equipment. Slovak prime minister Peter Pellegrini said the government was preparing to purchase masks from a Chinese supplier. He then said, "However, a dealer from Germany came there first, paid more for the shipment, and bought it." Ukraine lawmaker Andriy Motovylovets stated, "Our consuls who go to factories find their colleagues from other countries (Russia, United States, France, Germany, Italy, etc) who are trying to obtain our orders. We have paid upfront by wire transfer and have signed contracts. But they have more money, in cash. We have to fight for each shipment." San Marino authorities said they arranged a bank transfer to a supplier in Lugano, Switzerland, to buy a half-million masks to be shared with Italian neighbours, but were outbid.

Germany snatched 830,000 surgical masks that were arriving from China and destined for Italy before Italian authorities persuaded Germany to release them. 1.5 million face masks that were supposed to be shipped from Spain to Slovenia were seized by German agents. French guards confiscated lorries filled with 130,000 face masks and boxes of sanitisers bound for the UK. Italian customs police hijacked some 800,000 imported masks and disposable gloves on their way to Switzerland.

Trade in medical supplies between the United States and China became politically complicated. Exports of face masks and other medical equipment to China from the United States (and many other countries) spiked in February, according to statistics from Trade Data Monitor, prompting criticism from the Washington Post that the United States government failed to anticipate the domestic needs for that equipment. Similarly, The Wall Street Journal raised concerns that US tariffs on imports from China threaten imports of medical supplies.

==== Reuse ====
Can facial masks be disinfected for re-use?
Cleaning method	Meltblown fibre filtration media		Static-charged cotton		E. coli. Disinfection
Cleaning method	Filtration (%)	Pressure drop (Pa)	Filtration (%)	Pressure drop (Pa)	E. coli. Disinfection
Masks before treatment	96.76	8.33	78.01	5.33	(no E.coli)
70 °C hot air in oven, 30 min.	96.60	8.00	70.16	4.67	>99%
Ultraviolet light, 30 min.	95.50	7.00	77.72	6.00	>99%
5% alcohol soaking, drying	56.33	7.67	29.24	5.33	>99%
Chlorine-based, 5 min.	73.11	9.00	57.33	7.00	>99%
Vapor from boiling water, 10 min.	94.74	8.00	77.65	7.00	>99%

Mask shortages led to attempts to sanitise and reuse them.

FFP2 masks can be sanitised by 70 °C vapour. Sanitisation is not always simple. Alcohol disrupts N95 mask microfibres' static charge. Chlorine fumes may be harmful.

A Singaporean study found no contamination on masks after brief care of COVID-19 patients, suggesting masks could be reused for multiple patients.

==== DIY ====
Individuals and volunteers produced cloth masks for themselves and others. Various designs were shared online. 3D-printed "NanoHack" masks allowed hand-cut surgical mask to act as fine-particle filters.

Novel mask accessories were created by makers around the world using open source designs such as ear savers to make extended mask use more comfortable.

Makers improvised Arduino-controlled disinfection boxes, with temperature controls, to safely sanitise masks.

=== Face shields ===
A 3D-printable face shield frame

Makers learned to produce face-shields, although these turned out to be of marginal value, as SARS-CoV-2 turned out to be airborne and able to evade the protections that face shields provide. They collectively produced a total of at least 25 million face shields with techniques including 3D printing, laser cutting, and Injection molding.

== Medical care devices ==
Critical care or ICU beds, mechanical ventilation and ECMO devices were critical bottlenecks early in the pandemic.

=== Oxygen masks ===
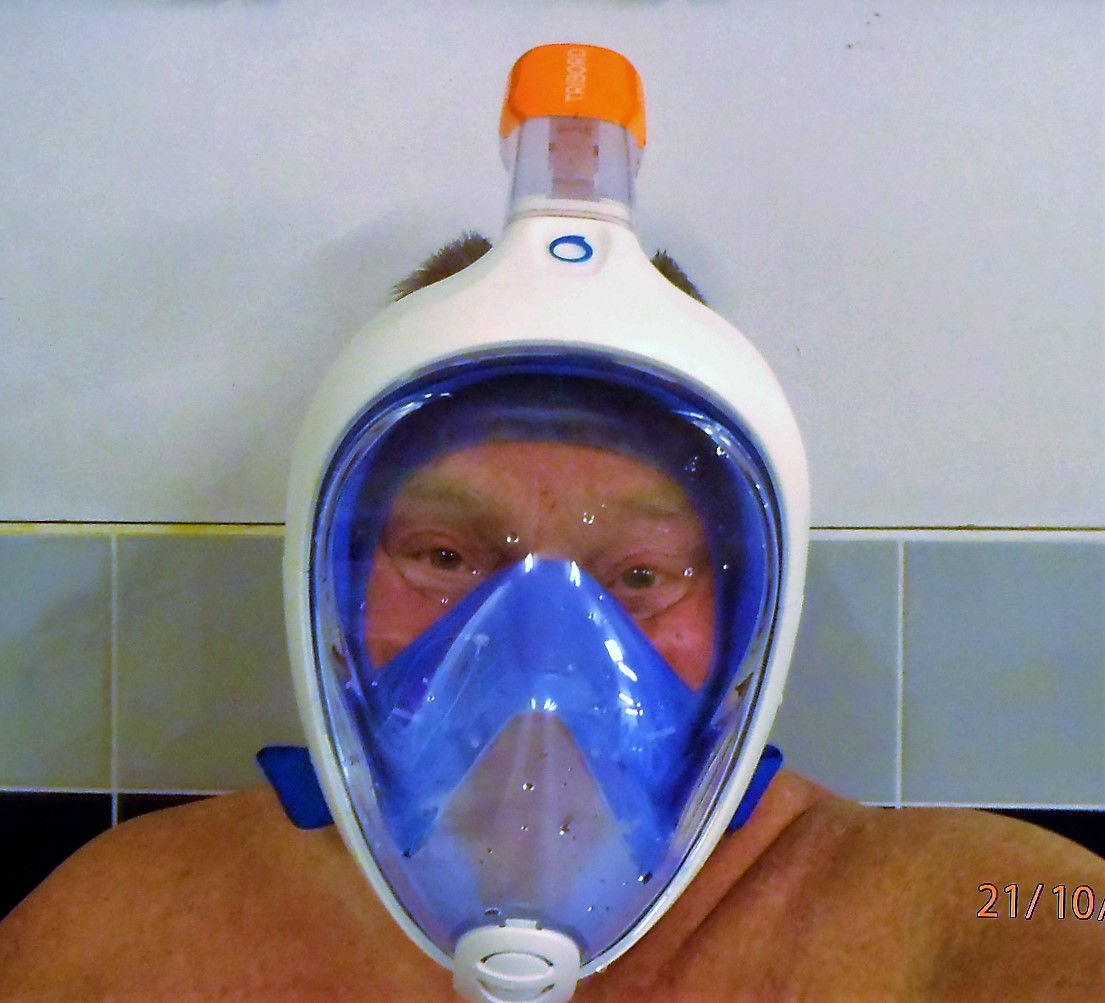
Common snorkelling masks have been adapted into oxygenation masks via minor changes and 3D-printed adapters.

Popular snorkelling masks were adapted into oxygen dispensing respiratory masks via the usage of 3D printed adapters. According to Italian law usage by a patient requires a signed declaration of acceptance of an uncertified biomedical device. The project provided 3D files for free, as well as forms to register hospitals in need and 3D makers willing to produce adapters. In France, sportswear and snorkelling mask producer Decathlon redirected its mask output toward the pandemic. An international collaboration included Decathlon, BIC, Stanford.

Maker group Plan B in Romania produced more than 2,000 modified snorkeling masks to combat the pandemic.

=== Intensive care beds ===
In early March, the UK government supported a strategy to develop herd immunity to COVID-19, drawing criticism from medical personnel and researchers. Spooked by wildly exaggerated forecasts by the Imperial College COVID-19 Response Team that the demand for intensive care beds would exceed the inventory by 7.5, around 16 March, the UK government switched to a mitigation/suppression strategy.

In France, around 15 March, the Grand Est region noted the scarcity of CCB. Assistance-publique Hôpitaux de Paris (AP-HP), which manages most hospitals in the Paris area (≈10 million inhabitants), reported the need for 3,000–4,000 ICU beds against a capacity of between 350 and 1500.

In France, given shortages of ICU hospital beds in Grand Est and Ile-de-France regions, severe but stable patients with ARS and breathing assistance have been moved toward other regional medical centers within France, Germany, Austria, Luxembourg, or Switzerland.

=== Mechanical ventilation ===
Mechanical ventilation was initially called "the device that becomes the decider between life and death" because 3.2% of detected cases were thought to need ventilation during treatment. Ventilator shortages are endemic in the developing world. In case of shortage, triage strategies had been discussed. One strategy was to grade the patient on dimensions such as prospects for short-term survival, prospects for long-term survival, stage of life; pregnancy and fairness. The original 15 to 20 day intubation duration was a complicating factor in the shortage.

==== Official assessments ====
In the 2000s, the CDC estimated a national shortage of 40–70,000 ventilators in case of pandemic influenza. This assessment led to Project Aura, a public-private initiative to design a $3,000 simple to mass-produce ventilator that could supply the Strategic National Stockpile. Newport Medical Instruments won the contract, designing and prototyping (2011) the ventilators, and expecting to later profit by moving into the private market where competing devices were sold for $10,000. In April 2012, Health and Human Services officials confirmed to the US Congress that the project was on schedule to file for market approval in late 2013, after which the device would go into mass-production. In May 2012, US$12 billion medical conglomerate Covidien acquired Newport for $100 million. Covidien soon asked to cancel the contract. Former Newport executives, officials and executives at rival ventilator companies claimed that Covidien acquired Newport to avoid disturbing its market. Covidien merged in 2015 into Medtronic. Project Aura contracted with Philips healthcare. In July 2019, the FDA signed for 10,000 units of their Trilogy Evo portable ventilator to be delivered to the SNS by mid-2020.

On 25 March 2020, New York Governor Andrew Cuomo forecasting a severe ventilator shortage. Cuomo claimed his state would need about 30,000 ventilators to handle the pandemic, against an inventory of 4,000. On 27 March, President Donald Trump stated "I don't believe you need 40,000 or 30,000 ventilators", but later that day invoked the Defense Production Act to accelerate production.

==== Industrial suppliers ====
In Europe, Löwenstein Medical had been producing 1,500 ICU-level and 20,000 home-level ventilators annually for France alone. The company pointed out the production shortage. Their components were of European origin. It recommended focusing on home-level ventilators that could be assembled in 30 minutes. The bottleneck was trained workers. ICU-level ventilators typically lasted 10 to 15 years. Germany and other European country started to take control over the company's output.

Chinese manufacturers also increased production.

Medtronic made ventilator design specifications publicly available.

==== Improvised ventilators ====
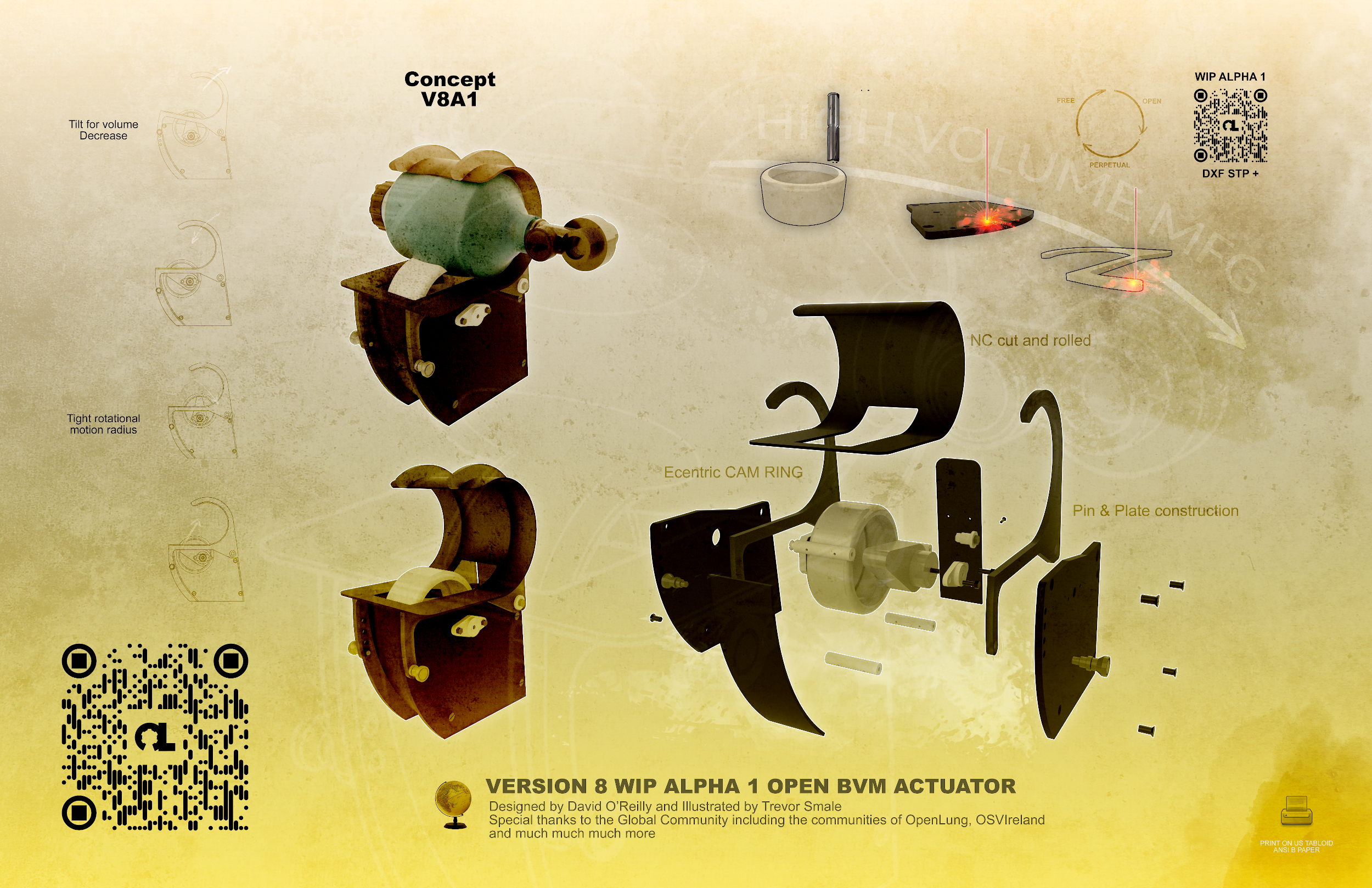
The Open Source Ventilator's OpenLung project, an open source, low resource, quick deployment mechanical ventilator design that uses a bag valve mask (BVM or Ambu-bag) as a core component.

The United Kingdom identified a ventilator shortage in 2016 during the NHS's Exercise Cygnus, but government stockpiles remained insufficient. In March, the British government called for industry to make ventilators for the NHS. Dyson and Babcock revealed plans to create 30,000 ventilators. The Ventilator Challenge involved companies such as Airbus, Rolls-Royce and Ford. This was seen as inadequate; the proposed ventilators would not have been usable in hospitals. None of the companies reached the final stages of testing and the majority were unneeded.

Another strategy is to modify circuits to ventilate multiple patients simultaneously from one ventilator. Anesthetist Dr. Alan Gauthier from Ontario, Canada, demonstrated turning one single-patient ventilator into a nine-patient device thanks to a 2006 YouTube video by 2 doctors from Detroit. This and similar methods described for ventilator sharing used T-shaped tubes to split airflow and multiply the number of patients provided with respiratory support. Ventilator sharing was limited by differing lung compliance between the patients (leading to different, possibly harmful, differences in tidal volume delivered to each patient), pendelluft between patients in the circuit, as well as the potential to spread pathogens between the patients.

In Ireland, volunteers started the Open Source Ventilator Project in collaboration with medical staff.

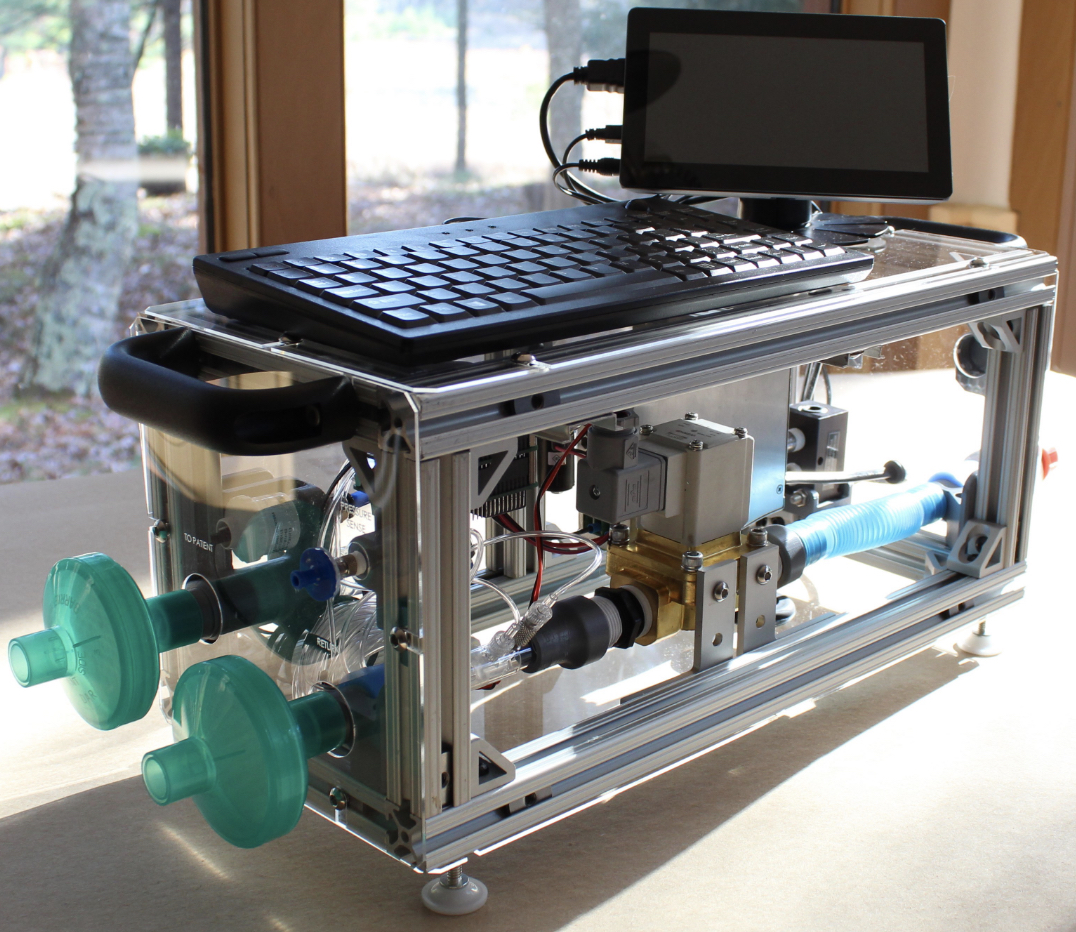
The fully open-source PVP-1 ventilator, developed at Princeton University.

In the United States, various teams such at MIT or Princeton developed open ventilator technology.

Hackers of the Ventilator Project proposed to re-purpose CPAP machines (sleep-apnea masks) as ventilators, hacking single ventilators to split air-flow and treat multiple patients, and using grounded aircraft as treatment facilities to leverage their oxygen-mask-per-seat infrastructure. Engineers familiar with device design and production, medical professionals familiar with existing respiratory devices and lawyers able to navigate FDA regulations were participants among the 350 volunteers involved. The central avenue of exploration was to abandon advanced features, including electronics and patient monitoring, to focus solely on respiration by pressured airflow. The group used an old Harry Diamond Laboratories "emergency army respirator" model to study.

Shared Ventilation

Shared ventilation was an idea to fit six people one on ventilator, freeing up five ventilators for use by others. Simulations indicated that this would increase resistance to the extent that it didn't help patients. Increasing the settings restored ventilator function.

== Facilities ==
=== Hospitals ===
As Wuhan's situation worsened and to assist the overwhelmed Central Hospital of Wuhan and Dabie Mountain Regional Medical Centre, China built two emergency field hospitals within a few days: the Huoshenshan Hospital and Leishenshan Hospital. The hospitals were phased out in March 2020.

French President Emmanuel Macron announced a military hospital would be set up in the Grand-Est region, to provide up to 30 ICU beds. The hospital was tested 7 days later.

By 8 March, Lombardy had created 482 new ICU beds. Lodi's ICU director reported that every square metre and every aisle of the hospital had been re-purposed for severe COVID-19 patients, increasing ICU beds from 7 to 24. In Monza, 3 new wards of 50 beds each were opened on 17 March. In Bergamo, gastrology, internal medicine, neurology services were repurposed.

In the UK, almost the entire private health stock of beds was requisitioned, numbering 8,000 beds. Three Nightingale Hospitals were created by NHS England and the military, to provide an additional 10–11,000 critical care beds, another 1,000-bed hospital in Scotland, and a 3,000-bed hospital at the Principality Stadium in Cardiff. Temporary wards were constructed in hospital car parks, and existing wards re-organised to free up 33,000 beds in England and 3,000 in Scotland. A hangar at Birmingham Airport was converted into a 12,000 body mortuary.

=== Morgues ===
Shortages of space in New York City morgues led the city to propose temporary burial in parks.

== Health workers ==
Healthcare workers also were in critically short supply in some jurisdictions. The pandemic filled many hospitals and limited the personnel who were equipped to care for patients. Training requirements further limited resources, while numerous staff themselves became infected.

Laboratory workers were brought into the limelight as the COVID-19 testing skyrocketed. Laboratory staff was already reduced, as well as funding shortages, so the pandemic created another strain on those already present issues.

Mitigations included recruiting military and sports medics, final-year doctors in training, private sector staff, and re-recruiting retired staff and those who have moved from the medical sector. For non-medical roles, staff have been recruited from other sectors.

Various health care systems resorted to increasing patient to nurse ratios when patient loads rose, leading nurses to higher mortality rates, burnout, and dissatisfaction.

=== Isolation and trauma ===
The American Medical Association created a guide for healthcare organizations to reduce psychosocial trauma and increase the resilience of medical staff.

Paola, Valentine, and Rossella reported that healthcare professionals experienced an impact on their mental health, including stress, anxiety, depression, and sleep disorders, which in some cases, exacerbated staff shortages as workers attempted to cope with high case fatality rates early in the pandemic.

=== Sickness and death ===
In Italy, at least 293 doctors died from COVID-19 by mid-2022.

Acute respiratory distress syndrome (ARDS) is a form of pneumonia in which air sacs become filled with fluid leaking from the capillaries lungs. Associated inflammation and edema decrease lung compliance, requiring more aggressive treatment and often landing patients in the ICU.

In mid-March 2020 in Lombardy, medical staff reported high levels of staff infections. In Lodi, doctors from other services have been called to attend Covid patients. In Cremona, patient admissions were three times normal, with only 50% of staff available. On 12 March 8% of Italy's 13,382 cases were health workers. Between 5 and 10% of deaths were medical staff. On 17 March, one of the largest hospital of the Bergamo region ran out of ICU beds, and patients were flown to other regions.

About 14% of Spanish cases in March 2020 were medical staff.

In the United States, about 62,000 healthcare workers had tested positive by late May 2020; while 291 had died (0.47%).

By late May, Mexico had 11,000 medical staff detected as infected, depleting medical ranks.

== Industrial products ==
=== Commodities ===
The pandemic increased consumer demand for propane because more people stayed home during winter, increasing the need for domestic heating and cooking. In the United States, shortages of propane were reported in Kentucky, Louisiana, and Wisconsin in January 2021.

In the United States the pandemic caused a shortage of lumber and steel in 2021.

=== Semiconductors ===
Increased demand for electronics coincided with semiconductor production disruptions, including a drought in Taiwan (impacting companies such as TSMC). US sanctions on Semiconductor Manufacturing International Corporation (SMIC)—China's largest semiconductor manufacturer—were part of an ongoing trade war. which increased orders for competitors.

These shortages reduced production in the automobile and consumer electronics industries. The shortage was amplified by forecasting errors in the automotive industry, which expected that "work-from home" would reduce sales. They reduced their orders, leading semiconductor makers to reduce investment. When automotive demand quickly recovered, the industry was unable to respond. By October 2021, multiple automakers had announced plans to cut or halt production.

The chip shortage and a major increase in cryptocurrency mining led to a shortage in high-end graphics cards for computers. Microsoft and Sony Interactive Entertainment warned of shortages of their Xbox Series and PlayStation 5 video game consoles due to high demand and supply chain disruption.

== Consumer goods ==
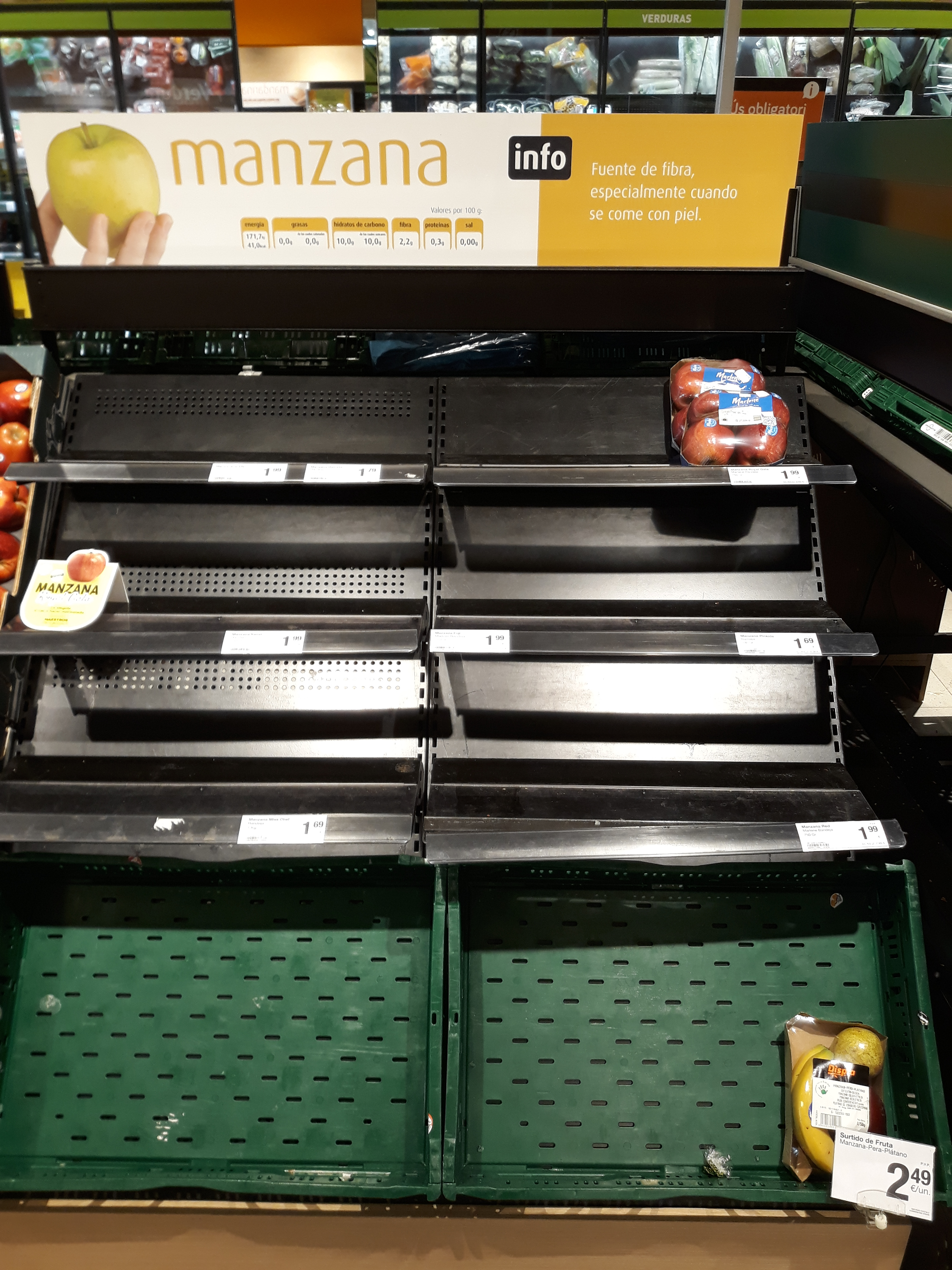
Near empty shelves at a Consum supermarket, with ample produce shown in background. 14 March 2020.

Some daily goods shortages came as a result of supply chain disruptions and demand spikes, leading to empty shelves. Affected products included toilet paper, hand sanitiser, cleaning supplies, canned food, freezers and other household appliances, sewing machines, blood, flour and baking yeast, game consoles, computers, poultry, and swimming pool chlorine.

Some shortages were caused by changes in consumer behavior that did not include hoarding. Many newly-homebound workers began baking bread, and there were resulting shortages in flour and yeast as well as other baking supplies. Bicycle shortages emerge as public transport was impacted. The problem was exacerbated by manufacturing declines.

Many shortages were attributed to lean manufacturing, in which many manufactures relied on just-in-time deliveries instead of maintaining larger inventories.

In spring 2020, some factories that manufacture condoms were forced to shut down or reduce operations, including the world's largest producer.

=== Paper products ===
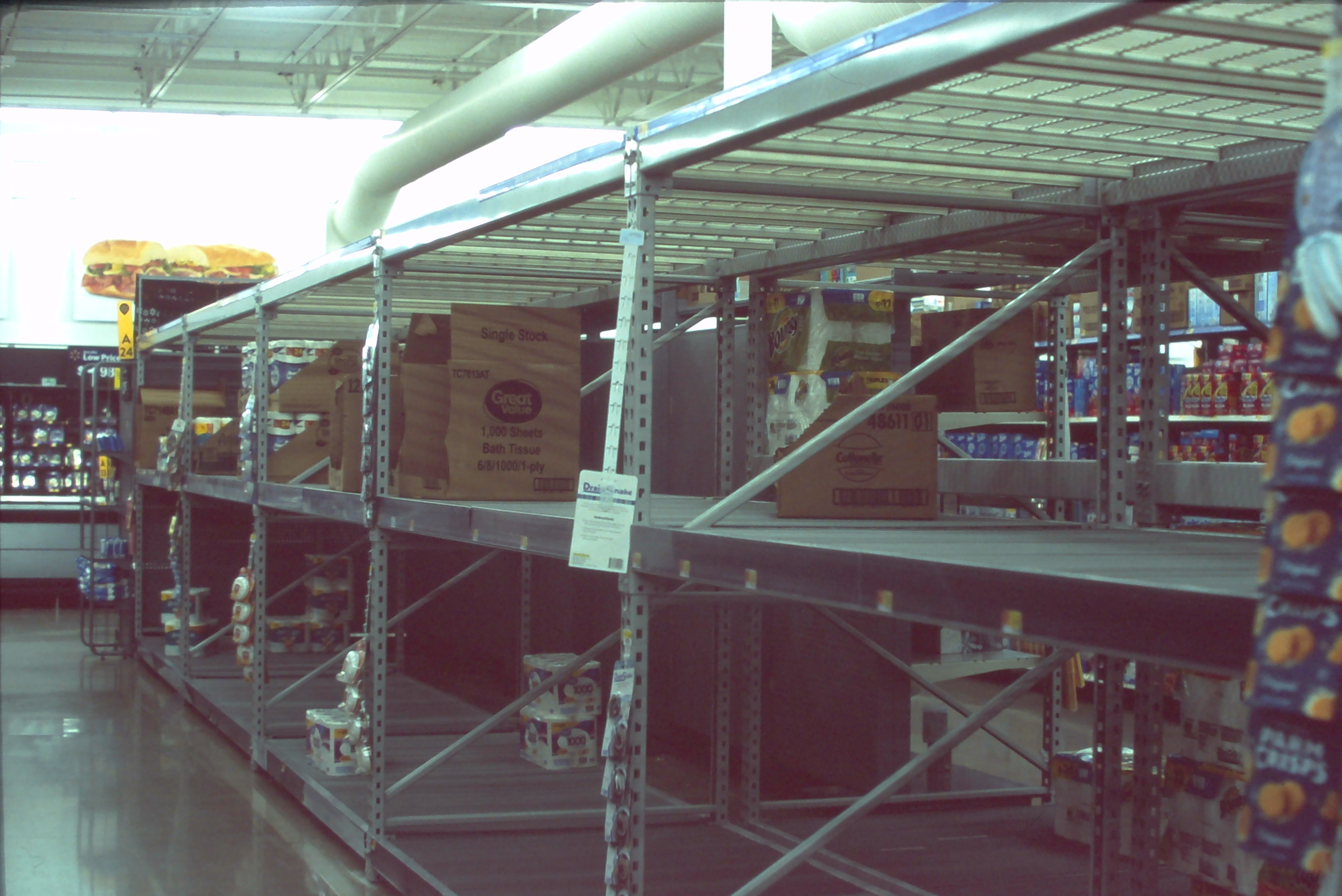
Empty shelves of toilet paper at a Walmart

The pandemic initially led to shortages of toilet paper in various countries. The shortage extended to paper towels, tissues, and diapers. Initially this was blamed on panic buying, despite reassurance from industry and government that neither was likely to occur. Some consumers began hoarding toilet paper, leading to reports of empty shelves, which spiraled into widespread disruption. Essential supply locator sites and tools attempted to assist communities in finding local sources as online retailers stocked out.

However, by early April 2020, other factors worsened the situation. Stay-at-home orders led people to spend less time elsewhere. Public toilets were used less and home toilets more. Reorganizing distribution and product mix (public vs home) took time. The Wall Street Journal declared the shortage essentially over in April 2021.

=== Tampons in the US ===
In the US, shortages and price increases of tampons and other feminine hygiene products were caused by supply chain disruptions, staffing problems, and raw material costs. As of mid-June 2022, approximately 7 percent of tampon products were out of stock, and many shoppers struggled to find their preferred brand. Tampons were reported to be in short supply for more than six months.

=== Aluminium cans ===
The shift of beverage consumption from public places to homes created an aluminium can shortage in the United States.

== Others ==
In France, closed borders prevented seasonal workers from entering the country. The Minister of Agriculture called for jobless volunteers to contact strawberry farms to help collect the harvest.

Laboratory mice were culled, and some strains were at risk of shortage due to lockdowns early in the pandemic.

In the United States, social distancing reduced blood donations.

== See also ==
- List of countries by hospital beds
- Economic impact of the COVID-19 pandemic
- 2021–2023 global supply chain crisis
- 2024 United States drug shortages
