= 2021–2023 global supply chain crisis =

Disruption to global trade, 2021–2023

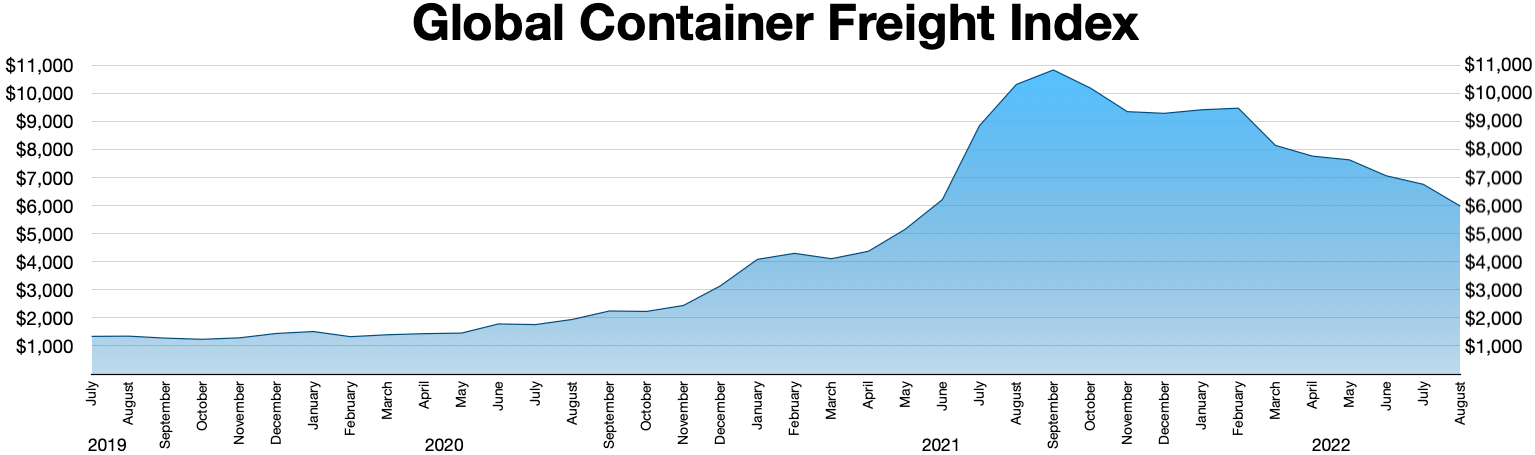
Global Container Freight Index, July 2019 – August 2022

In 2021, as a consequence of the COVID-19 pandemic and, later, the ongoing Russian invasion of Ukraine combined with the Iran War, global supply chains and shipments slowed, causing worldwide shortages and affecting consumer patterns. Causes of the economic slowdown included workers becoming sick with COVID-19 as well as mandates and restrictions affecting the availability of staff. In cargo shipping, goods remained at port due to staffing shortages.

The related global chip shortage has contributed to the supply chain crisis, specifically in the automobile and electronics sectors. During the Christmas and holiday season of 2021, an increase in spending in North America, combined with the spread of the SARS-CoV-2 Omicron variant, further exacerbated already tight supplies.

Long tail effects of the supply chain crises are contributing to ongoing food security issues related to the pandemic, including the 2022 food crises.

== Causes ==
In early 2020, the COVID-19 pandemic initially slowed the global supply chain as manufacturers suspended work until safety precautions were enacted. Despite rosy forecasts from businesses for the next year, global trade continued at a reduced capacity and did not fully recover. New challenges in 2021, including the Delta variant and reduced access to the COVID-19 vaccine in developing countries, further exacerbated the recovery of global production even as the economies of wealthier, vaccinated regions, such as the United States and Europe, resumed their patterns of consumption.

Vietnam, for example, is a major provider of American apparel. The country worked through the pandemic in 2020, with a strict lockdown procedure, but outbreaks in 2021 forced many manufacturers to close, especially as workers remained largely unvaccinated. To sustain production in 2021, the Vietnamese government required workers in higher-risk regions to live at their workplace.

Economists pointed to lean manufacturing (also known as "just-in-time" manufacturing) as a major source of the supply chain disruption. The lean manufacturing method relies on well-tuned matching between the raw material input and finished good output of production facilities to minimize the amount of products stored in warehouses and thereby save money on overhead costs. It is notably weak to unexpected shifts in demand because it requires extremely accurate demand forecasting to achieve the savings and economies of scale that are its main benefits. When the COVID-19 pandemic began to shut down manufacturing facilities, it set off a chain reaction of disruption to the many companies which adopted lean principles in their production pipeline. Later, as demand skyrocketed for consumer goods and medical supplies like personal protective equipment (PPE), these same facilities were unable to keep up with demand, leading to massive backlogs. These disruptions cascaded into the global shipping industry where ports like the Port of Los Angeles, a major hub for imports from Asia, are unable to clear their shipyards in a timely fashion, further exacerbating the supply chain crisis. This has led to suggestions that stockpiles and diversification of suppliers should be more heavily focused.

== Shipping ==
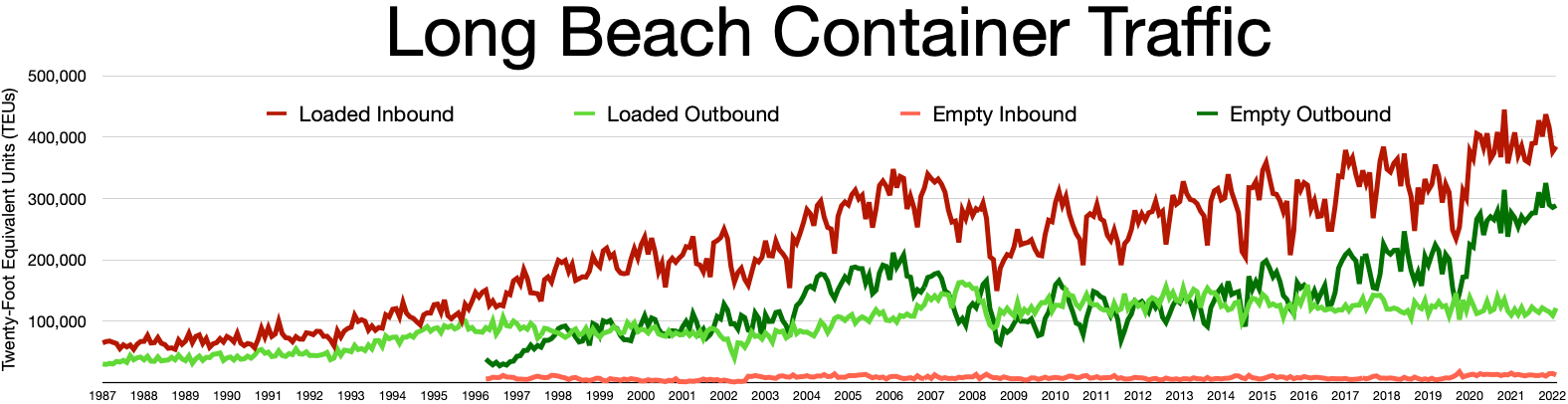
Port of Long Beach traffic Loaded Imports Empty Exports Loaded Exports Empty Imports

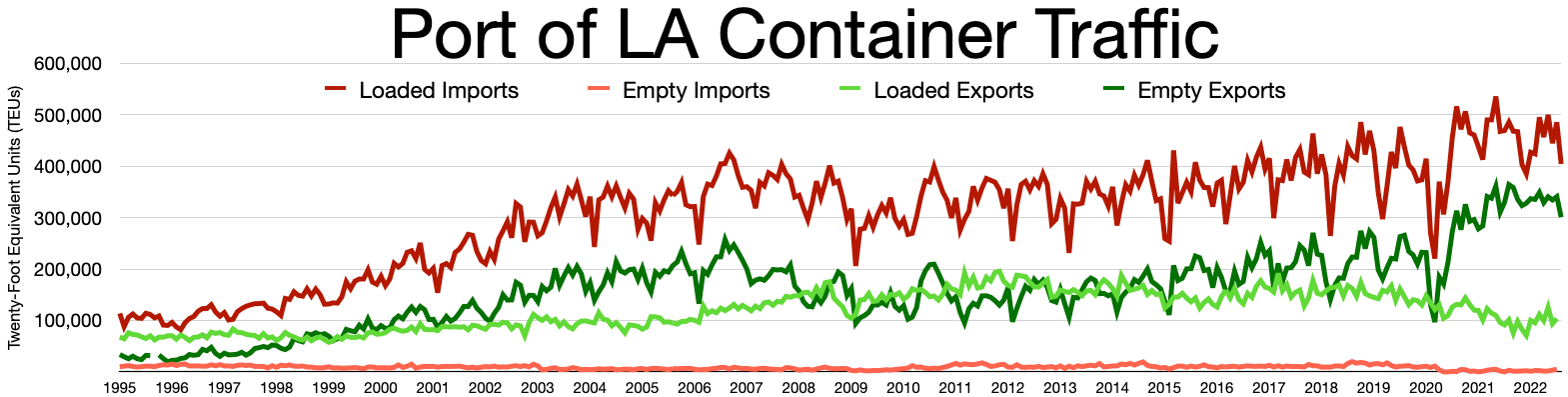
Port of LA traffic Loaded Imports Empty Exports Loaded Exports Empty Imports

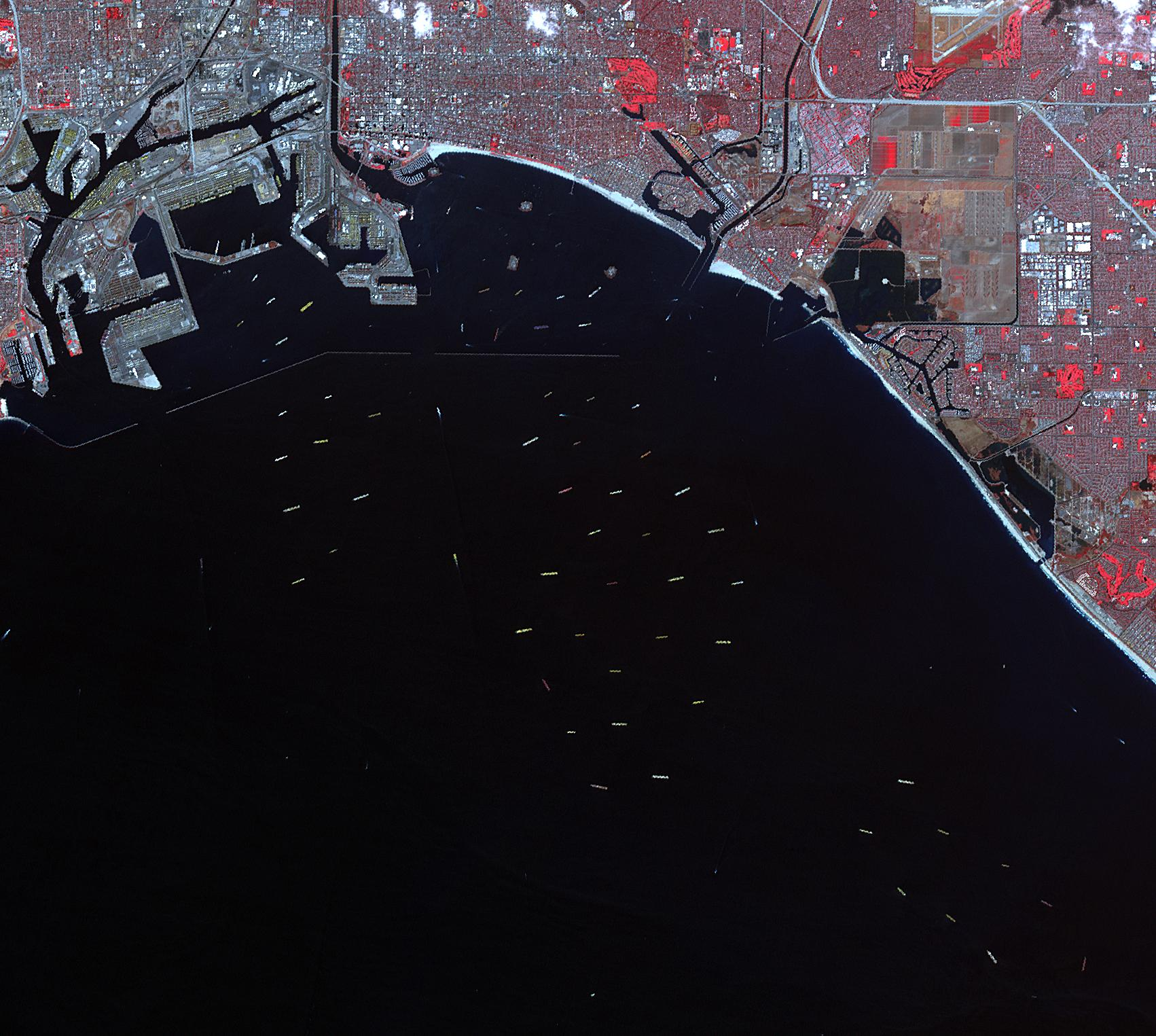
Backup at Port of Los Angeles and Port of Long Beach, October 2021

By mid-2021, major American ports became inundated with historic amounts of inbound cargo. Terminal staff lacked the bandwidth to process the cargo, leading to extended wait times. Container ships began to stall outside ports for days or weeks. This surge spread inland as rail and trucking services struggled under the increased load alongside a labor shortage. The United States trucking industry was already short on drivers before the pandemic, with high turnover and subpar compensation. Though enough shipping containers exist to handle global needs, given the amount held in transit or misplaced in wrong parts of the supply chain, containers entered short supply. Additionally, half of the sailor population comes from developing, under-vaccinated countries.

== Effects ==
Large American retailers chartered container ships in early preparation for the holiday season. Container shipping companies were encouraged to develop and innovate technology-driven processes in shipping to achieve external influence free shipping.

On October 17, 2021, United States Secretary of Transportation Pete Buttigieg predicted that the crisis would "certainly" extend into 2022. In November, the Chinese Minister of Commerce advised citizens to stock food supplies for the winter.

According to a November 2021 report from Adobe Digital Insights, online shoppers were met with more than 2 billion out-of-stock messages in October 2021, which was double the rate reported in October 2020. In the United States the list of products that are in short supply included electronics, jewelry, clothing, pet supplies and home and garden items.

As the world economy has struggled to regain its footing amidst the events of the past few years, Chinese exports have skyrocketed in the global market, rapidly increasing production to cover the quickly-rising global demand. In just one year, China's trade surplus with the US alone rose to $335.5 billion in 2021, up from $308.1 billion in 2020.

The supply chain crisis is a major contributing factor in the 2022 United States infant formula shortage, the tampon shortage and various drugs shortages.

In December of 2022, it was reported that global demand for commercial jet aircraft far exceeded supply, with Jefferies Group reporting a backlog of 12,720 aircraft. Boeing and Airbus, which produce more than 90% the world's commercial airliners, are sold out for most of their most popular models until 2029.

Despite some recovery after 2023, supply chains are still experiencing stress; by May 2025 the Global Supply Chain Pressure Index had risen to 0.19, reflecting renewed systemic bottlenecks.

== Future prospects ==
In December 2021, CEOs of major automotive manufacturers and electronics makers said they expected the shortage of semiconductor chips to continue through the first half of 2022. Sales in India fell approximately 20 percent in 2021 due to the shortage of chips and the amount of light vehicles lost to shortages was half a million vehicles.

In February 2022, Peter S. Goodman, writing in The New York Times, argued that returning to the pre-COVID-19-pandemic global supply chain was seen as "unlikely" in 2022.

India, the United States, and Brazil are hardest hit in the supply chain with significant shortages of many different product categories. Interruptions in the supply chain have proved particularly difficult to overcome and control, which has put these countries at a disadvantage in global trade. Particularly affected by the loss are regions where there are challenges to democracy or human rights issues. China, like India, stood out as one of the losers in the battle for the supply chain.

In addition to the impact of COVID-19 on supply chains around the world, the conflict between Russia and Ukraine has also had a major impact on the product supply crisis. It will affect the global economy and trade, with Russia and Ukraine accounting for more than 25% of world wheat trade and more than 60% of global sunflower oil and 30% of world barley exports. It will have an impact on the global supply chain as Russia is a significant source of 35 critical minerals vital to the United States' economic and national security interests, including 30% of the global supply of platinum-group elements (including palladium), 13% of titanium and 11% of nickel.

A factor that will also leave its mark on the supply chain is the global inflation rate. In 2021 it was projected to reach an inflation rate of about 4% to 5% percent but exceeded expectations and the global inflation rate ranges from 7% to 8% as of June 2022.

== See also ==
- 2021–2023 inflation surge
- 2021 Suez Canal obstruction
- 2024 United States drug shortages
- COVID-19 recession
- Global energy crisis (2021–2023)
- Great Resignation
- Shortages related to the COVID-19 pandemic
- Tang ping
