= United States responses to the COVID-19 pandemic (disambiguation) =

United States responses to the COVID-19 pandemic refers to the overall U.S. response to the COVID-19 pandemic.

It may also refer to:

- U.S. federal government response to the COVID-19 pandemic
- U.S. state and local government responses to the COVID-19 pandemic
