= Premier, Inc. =

American healthcare company

- Type: Private
- Founded: 2013; 13 years ago
- Headquarters: Charlotte, North Carolina, U.S.
- Key people: Emad Rizk (President and CEO)
- Revenue: ▼US$1.336 billion (2023)
- Net income: ▼US$174.887 million (2023)
- Number of employees: 2,800 (2023)
- Website: premierinc.com

Premier, Inc. is an American healthcare company headquartered in Charlotte, North Carolina. Initially, it was a hospital buying group, pooling healthcare purchases to reduce prices.

Premier became a public company via an initial public offering in September 2013, raising $760 million. In 2019, two years after acquiring Stanson Health for $51.5 million, Premier bought the healthcare technology firm Medpricer for $35 million.

In 2020, Premier partnered with McLaren Health Care to acquire a minority stake in Prestige Ameritech, a manufacturer of personal protective equipment. The company sold its non-GPO business lines to OMNIA Partners in 2023 for $800 million.

In 2025, the company agreed to be taken private by Patient Square Capital, an investment management firm, in a $2.6 billion deal. The transaction was completed on November 25, 2025.

In May 2026, Emad Rizk, M.D. was named President and Chief executive officer of Premier, Inc., succeeding Michael J. Alkire. Rizk previously served as Chairman, President and CEO of KKR & Co.'s Cotiviti, and was formerly head of R1 RCM (previously Accretive Health). In June 2026, he was appointed to the steering group of the National Academy of Medicine's initiative for Patient Safety in the Era of AI.

== Awards ==
- National Quality Forum's John M. Eisenberg Patient Safety and Quality Award (2016)
- Cigna Well-Being Award for the years 2016, 2017, 2019 and 2020
