= United States responses to the COVID-19 pandemic =

The United States' response to the COVID-19 pandemic with consists of various measures by the medical community; the federal, state, and local governments; the military; and the private sector. The public response has been highly polarized, with partisan divides being observed and a number of concurrent protests and unrest complicating the response.

== Medical response ==
=== Initial response outside the U.S. ===
On January 6, a week after the U.S. was informed about the outbreak in China, both the Health and Human Services department and the CDC offered to send a team of U.S. health experts to China. According to CDC Director Robert R. Redfield, the Chinese government refused to let them in, which contributed to the U.S. getting a late start in identifying the danger of their outbreak and containing it before it reached other countries. Secretary Alex Azar said China did notify the world much sooner than it had after their SARS outbreak in 2003, but it was unexplainably turning away CDC help for this new one.

On January 28, the CDC updated its China travel recommendations to level 3, its highest alert. Azar submitted names of U.S. experts to the WHO and said the U.S. would provide $105 million in funding, adding that he had requested another $136 million from Congress. On February 8, the WHO's director-general announced that a team of international experts had been assembled to travel to China and he hoped officials from the CDC would also be part of that mission. The WHO team consisted of thirteen international researchers, including two Americans, and toured five cities in China with twelve local scientists to study the epidemic February 16–23. The final report was released on February 28.

In late January, Boeing announced a donation of 250,000 medical masks to help address China's supply shortages. On February 7, The State Department said it had facilitated the transportation of nearly eighteen tons of medical supplies to China, including masks, gowns, gauze, respirators, and other vital materials. On the same day, U.S. Secretary of State Mike Pompeo announced a $100 million pledge to China and other countries to assist with their fights against the virus.

On February 28, the State Department offered to help Iran fight its own outbreak, as Iran's cases and deaths were dramatically increasing. Iran said, however, that U.S. sanctions were hampering its battle with the disease, which the U.S. denied, saying that Iran had mishandled the crisis.

=== Testing ===
Testing for SARS-CoV-2 can allow healthcare workers to identify infected people. It is also an important component of tracking the pandemic. There are various types of tests currently on the market; some identify whether or not a patient is currently infected, while others give information about previous exposure to the virus.

A report published in January 2021 revealed that a Chinese firm, BGI Group, was attempting to distribute its COVID-19 testing kits to at least 11 states in the US. The U.S. intelligence and security officials raised warnings about the security risks involved in using these kits, as BGI was trying to use the patients' DNA, via the gene-sequencing machines that were being pitched to the U.S. labs. However, federal agencies, including the Food and Drug Administration and the Federal Emergency Management Agency, as well as the United States Department of Health and Human Services were pushing the states to use the BGI testing kits, despite such warnings. Besides the 11 states, Nevada received the Chinese-made testing kits from Abu Dhabi's data and artificial intelligence firm, Group 42, in collaboration with BGI. Some of the testing supplies were used in Nevada, but states like Alabama, South Dakota, Ohio, Rhode Island, Massachusetts, Arkansas, California, Indiana, Kansas, North Carolina, and Pennsylvania didn't purchase the BGI kits.

=== Contact tracing ===
Contact tracing is a tool to control transmission rates during the reopening process. Some states like Texas and Arizona opted to proceed with reopening without adequate contact tracing programs in place. Health experts have expressed concerns about training and hiring enough personnel to reduce transmission. Privacy concerns have prevented measures such as those imposed in South Korea where authorities used cellphone tracking and credit card details to locate and test thousands of nightclub patrons when new cases began emerging. Funding for contact tracing is thought to be insufficient, and even better-funded states have faced challenges getting in touch with contacts. Congress allocated $631 million for state and local health surveillance programs, but the Johns Hopkins Center for Health Security estimated that $3.6 billion will be needed. The cost rises with the number of infections, and contact tracing is easier to implement when the infection count is lower. Health officials are also worried that low-income communities will fall further behind in contact tracing efforts which "may also be hobbled by long-standing distrust among minorities of public health officials".

As of July 1, 2020, only four states used contact tracing apps as part of their state-level strategies to control transmission. The apps documented digital encounters between smartphones, so the users would automatically be notified if someone they had contact with tested positive. Public health officials in California claimed that most of the functionality could be duplicated by using text, chat, email, and phone communications.

=== Drug therapy development ===
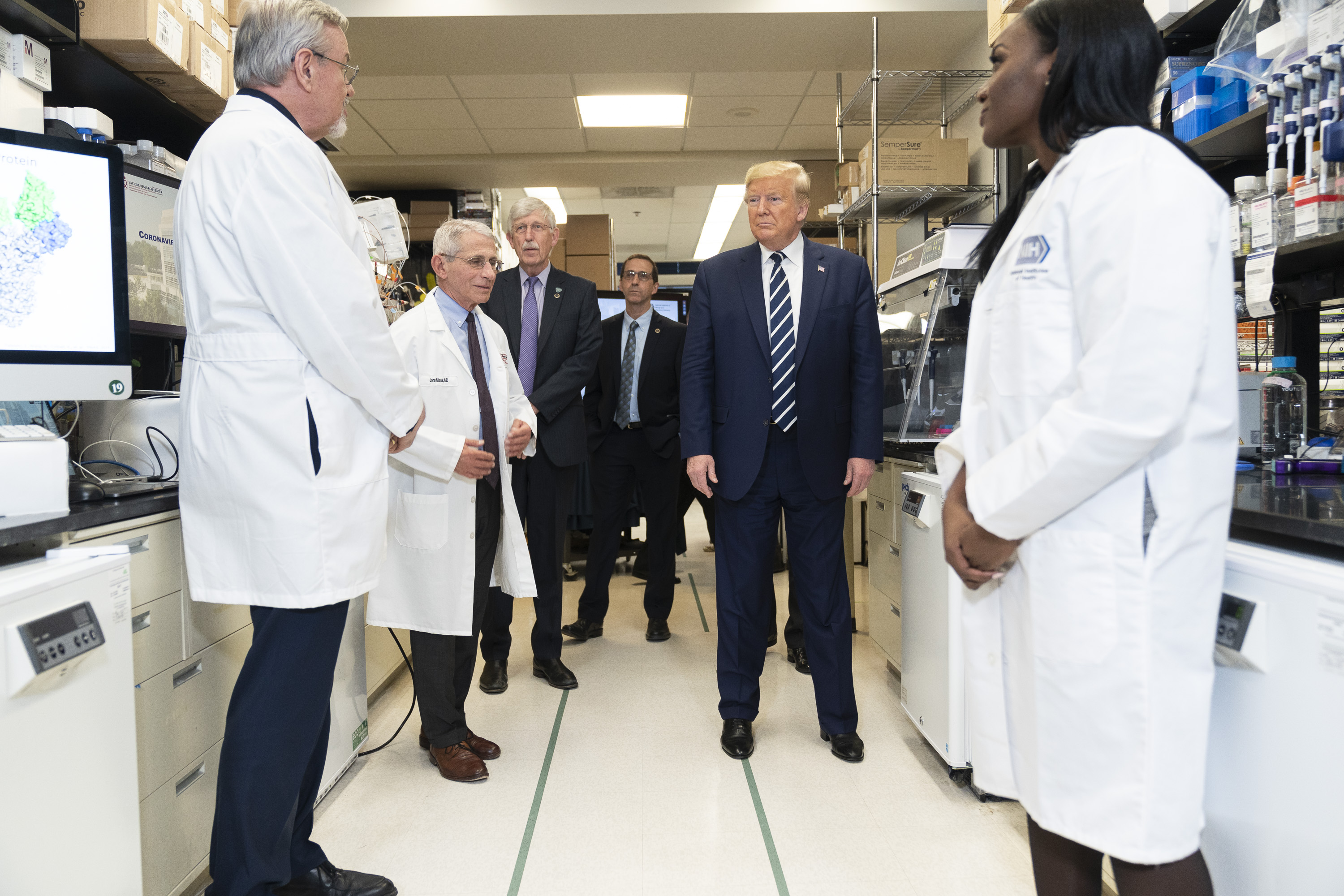
March 3: President Trump and Anthony Fauci visit the Vaccine Research Center and the Viral Pathogenesis Laboratory at the National Institutes of Health.

In the United States, remdesivir is indicated for use in adults and adolescents (aged twelve years and older with body weight at least 40 kilograms (88 lb)) for the treatment of COVID-19 requiring hospitalization. In November 2020, the FDA issued an emergency use authorization (EUA) for the combination of baricitinib with remdesivir, for the treatment of suspected or laboratory confirmed COVID-19 in hospitalized people two years of age or older requiring supplemental oxygen, invasive mechanical ventilation, or extracorporeal membrane oxygenation (ECMO). As of August 2020, there were more than 500 potential therapies for COVID-19 disease in various stages of preclinical or clinical research.

==== Hydroxychloroquine and chloroquine ====
In early March, President Trump directed the FDA to test certain medications to discover if they had the potential to treat COVID-19 patients. Among those were chloroquine and hydroxychloroquine, which have been successfully used to treat malaria for over fifty years. A small test in France by researcher Didier Raoult had given positive results, although the study was criticized for design flaws, small sample size, and the fact that it was published before peer review. One of Didier's COVID-19 studies was later retracted by the International Journal of Antimicrobial Agents.

On March 28, the FDA issued an Emergency Use Authorization (EUA) which allowed certain hospitalized COVID-19 patients to be treated with hydroxychloroquine or chloroquine. On June 15, the FDA revoked the EUA for hydroxychloroquine and chloroquine as potential treatments for COVID-19. The FDA said the available evidence showed "no benefit for decreasing the likelihood of death or speeding recovery". On July 1, the FDA published a review of safety issues associated with the drugs, including fatal cardiac arrhythmias among other side effects.

In late July, President Trump continued to promote the use of hydroxychloroquine for COVID-19. This contrasted with the position of the NIH, which stated the drug was "very unlikely to be beneficial to hospitalized patients with COVID-19".

=== Vaccine research, development, and deployment ===
From early 2020, more than 70 companies worldwide (with five or six operating primarily in the U.S.) began vaccine research. In preparation for large-scale production, Congress set aside more than $3.5 billion for this purpose as part of the CARES Act. On August 5, 2020, the United States agreed to pay Johnson and Johnson more than $1 billion to create 100 million doses of COVID-19 vaccine. The deal gave the U.S. an option to order an additional 200 million doses. The doses were supposed to be provided for free to Americans if they were used in a COVID-19 vaccination campaign.

BIO, a trade group including all makers of coronavirus vaccines except AstraZeneca, tried to persuade Secretary Azar to publish strict FDA guidelines that could help ensure the safety and public uptake of the vaccine. Politics impacted scientific practice, however, when the chief of staff Mark Meadows blocked the FDA when it was realized that the timing of the provisions would make it impossible for a vaccine to be authorized before the November election. Ultimately, the guidelines emerged from the Office of Management and Budget and were published on the FDA website.

On November 20, 2020, the Pfizer–BioNTech partnership submitted a request for emergency use authorization for its vaccine to the Food and Drug Administration (FDA), which was granted on December 11. On December 18, 2020, the FDA granted the Moderna vaccine emergency use authorization, which Moderna had requested on November 30, 2020.

Starting on December 14, 2020, the first doses of COVID-19 vaccine were administered. The CDC and each state keep track of the number of vaccines administered.

After taking office in January 2021, new president Joe Biden signed an executive order to increase production and distribution of vaccines, aiming to have a hundred million doses administered within his first 100 days in office. On February 13, 2021, the CDC published data showing that 50.6 million doses had been administered to 37 million people, 13 million fully vaccinated and the rest awaiting their second dose.

In an address on March 11, 2021, Biden announced that he would push for all states to make vaccination available universally to all adults no later than May 1 and announced other planned initiatives to enhance and widen distribution.

=== Medical supply shortages ===
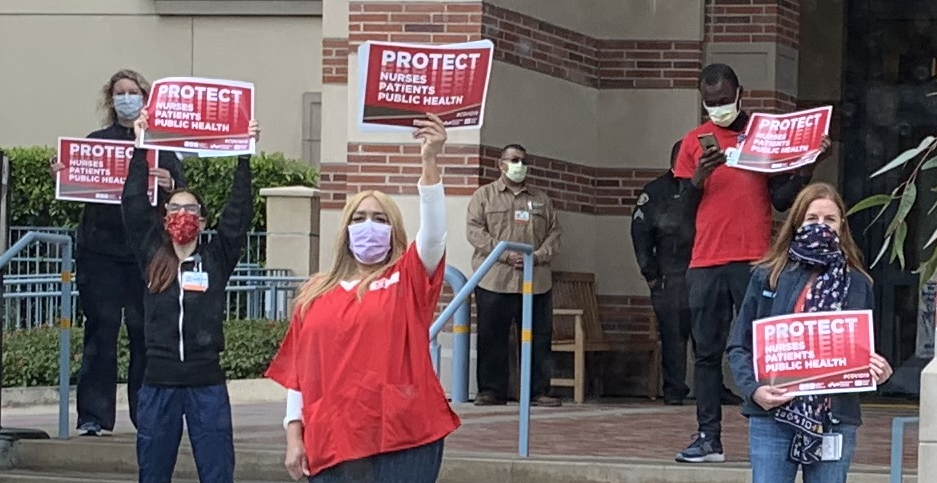
April 13: Protest by National Nurses United over lack of personal protective equipment at UCLA Medical Center

The first known case of COVID-19 in the U.S. was confirmed by the CDC on January 21, 2020. The next day, the owner of the medical supply company Prestige Ameritech wrote to HHS officials to say he could produce millions of N95 masks per month. In a follow-up letter on January 23, the business owner informed the government that "We are the last major domestic mask company," without success.

On February 5, Trump administration officials declined an offer for congressional coronavirus funding. Senator Chris Murphy recalled that the officials, including Secretary Azar, "didn't need emergency funding, that they would be able to handle it within existing appropriations." On February 7 Mike Pompeo announced the administration donated more than 35,000 pounds of "masks, gowns, gauze, respirators, and other vital materials" to China the same day the WHO warned about "the limited stock of PPE (personal protective equipment)".

In February, the Department of Commerce published guidance advising U.S. firms on compliance with Beijing's fast-track process for the sale of "critical medical products", which required the masks shipped overseas to meet U.S. regulatory standards. According to Chinese customs disclosures, more than six hundred tons of face masks were shipped to China in February.

In early March, the country had about twelve million N95 masks and thirty million surgical masks in the Strategic National Stockpile (SNS), but the DHS estimated the stockpile had only 1.2 percent of the roughly 3.5 billion masks that would be needed if COVID-19 were to become a "full-blown" pandemic. A previous 2015 CDC study found that seven billion N95 respirators might be necessary to handle a "severe respiratory outbreak".

As of March, the SNS had more than 19,000 ventilators (16,660 immediately available and 2,425 in maintenance), all of which dated from previous administrations. Vessel manifests maintained by U.S. Customs and Border Protection showed a steady flow of the medical equipment needed to treat the coronavirus being shipped abroad as recently as March 17. Meanwhile, FEMA said the agency "has not actively encouraged or discouraged U.S. companies from exporting overseas" and asked USAID to send back its reserves of protective gear for use in the U.S. President Trump evoked the Defense Production Act to prohibit some medical exports. Some analysts warned that export restrictions could cause retaliation from countries that have medical supplies the United States needs to import.

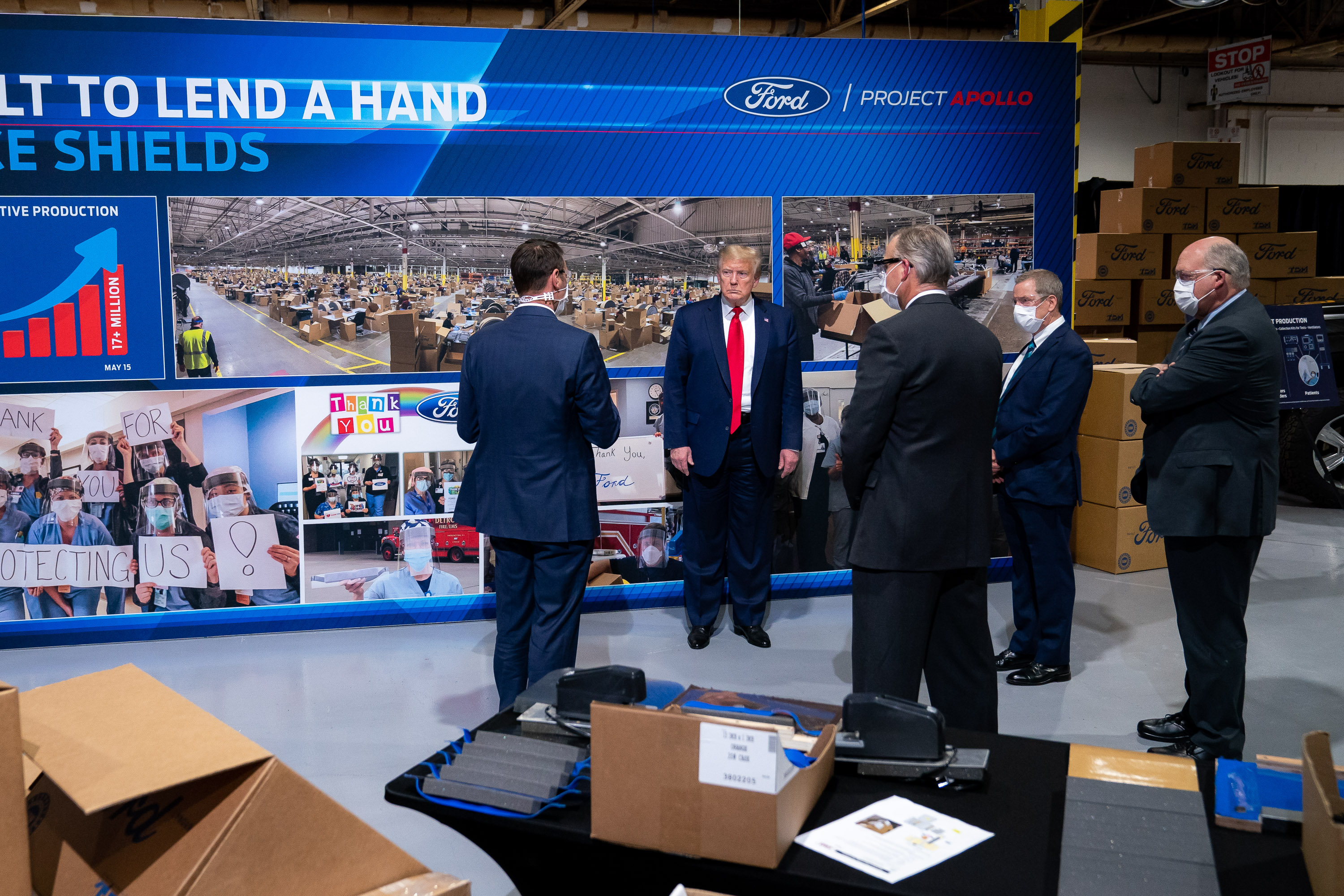
May 21: President Trump traveled to the Ford Rawsonville Components Plant in Ypsilanti, Michigan to tour the factory where ventilators were being produced.

By the end of March, states were in a bidding war against each other and the federal government for scarce medical supplies such as N95 masks, surgical masks, and ventilators. Meanwhile, as states scrambled to purchase supplies at inflated prices from third party distributors (some of which later turned out to be defective), hundreds of tons of medical-grade face masks were shipped by air freight to foreign buyers in China and other countries.

Medical organizations such as the American Medical Association and American Nurses Association implored Trump to obtain medical supplies, because they were "urgently needed". That led President Trump to sign an order setting motion parts of the Defense Production Act, first used during the Korean War, to allow the federal government a wide range of powers, including telling industries on what to produce, allocating supplies, giving incentives to industries, and allowing companies to cooperate. Trump then ordered auto manufacturer General Motors to make ventilators.

During this period, hospitals in the U.S. and other countries were reporting shortages of test kits, test swabs, masks, gowns, and gloves (collectively referred to as PPE.) The Office of Inspector General, U.S. Department of Health and Human Services released a report regarding their March 23–27 survey of 323 hospitals. The hospitals reported "severe shortages of testing supplies", "frequently waiting seven days or longer for test results", which extended the length of patient stays, and as a result, "strained bed availability, personal protective equipment (PPE) supplies, and staffing". The hospitals also reported, "widespread shortages of PPE" and "changing and sometimes inconsistent guidance from federal, state and local authorities". At a press briefing following the release of the report President Trump called the report "wrong" and questioned the motives of the author. Later he called the report "another fake dossier".

In early April, there was a widespread shortage of PPE, including masks, gloves, gowns, and sanitizing products. The difficulties in acquiring PPE for local hospitals led to orders for gowns and other safety items being confiscated by FEMA and diverted to other locations, which meant that in some cases states had to compete for the same PPE. Prices skyrocketed across the board, with PPE costing up to 10x more than normally. The shortages led in one instance of a governor asking the New England Patriots of the NFL to use their private plane to fly approximately 1.2 million masks from China to Boston. At that time, Veterans Affairs (VA) employees said nurses were having to use surgical masks and face shields instead of more protective N95 masks. In May, Rick Bright, a federal immunologist and whistleblower, testified that the federal government had not taken proper action to acquire the needed supplies.

An unexpectedly high percentage of COVID-19 patients in the ICU required dialysis as a result of kidney failure, about twenty percent. In mid-April, employees at some hospitals in New York City reported not having enough dialysis machines, were running low on fluids to operate the machines, and reported a shortage of dialysis nurses as many were out sick with COVID-19 due to lack of sufficient PPE.

On May 14, a Trump administration official told reporters "we do anticipate having 300 million" N95 masks by autumn; however, at the end of September, there were only 87.6 million N95 masks in the government stockpile.

Supply problems persisted in August 2020, when a survey reported 42 percent of nurses were experiencing widespread or intermittent shortages of personal protective equipment, with 60 percent using single-use equipment for five or more days. A September report by National Public Radio found some items were in short supply but others widely available, depending on the difficulty of manufacturing. The DPA was effective in producing ventilators but less so in producing N95s. As of September, the DPA had stimulated N95 production mainly by existing major manufacturers and less so by smaller companies. Additionally, the DPA's provision that exempts manufacturers from antitrust laws had not yet been used to encourage collaboration in N95 production.

In response to demand, many domestic businesses retooled and due to lack of federal coordination ended up producing a glut of hand sanitizer and face shields, some losing money due to oversupply or lack of distribution. Retooling and individual emergency supply making accounted for the production of at least 34.2 million pieces of PPE in the U.S., 14.5 million of which were face shields. The federal government used the Defense Production Act to get a small number of large manufacturers such as 3M and Honeywell to increase production of the more difficult to manufacture N95 masks, but supply was still falling hundreds of millions of units short of demand. NPR found the shortage could be resolved by providing government guarantees to small and medium-sized manufacturers so they could increase production of N95 masks without the risk of losing money or going out of business due to oversupply or drop in demand when the pandemic ends. President Trump denied the PPE shortages exist, calling them "fake news" in April and in September saying "we've opened up factories, we've had tremendous success with face masks and with shields." Demand also increased as various industries reopened, including medical and dental offices, construction, and trucking. The 2020 California wildfires further increased demand for N95 masks for agricultural and other outdoor workers, due to state regulations requiring protection during poor air quality conditions.

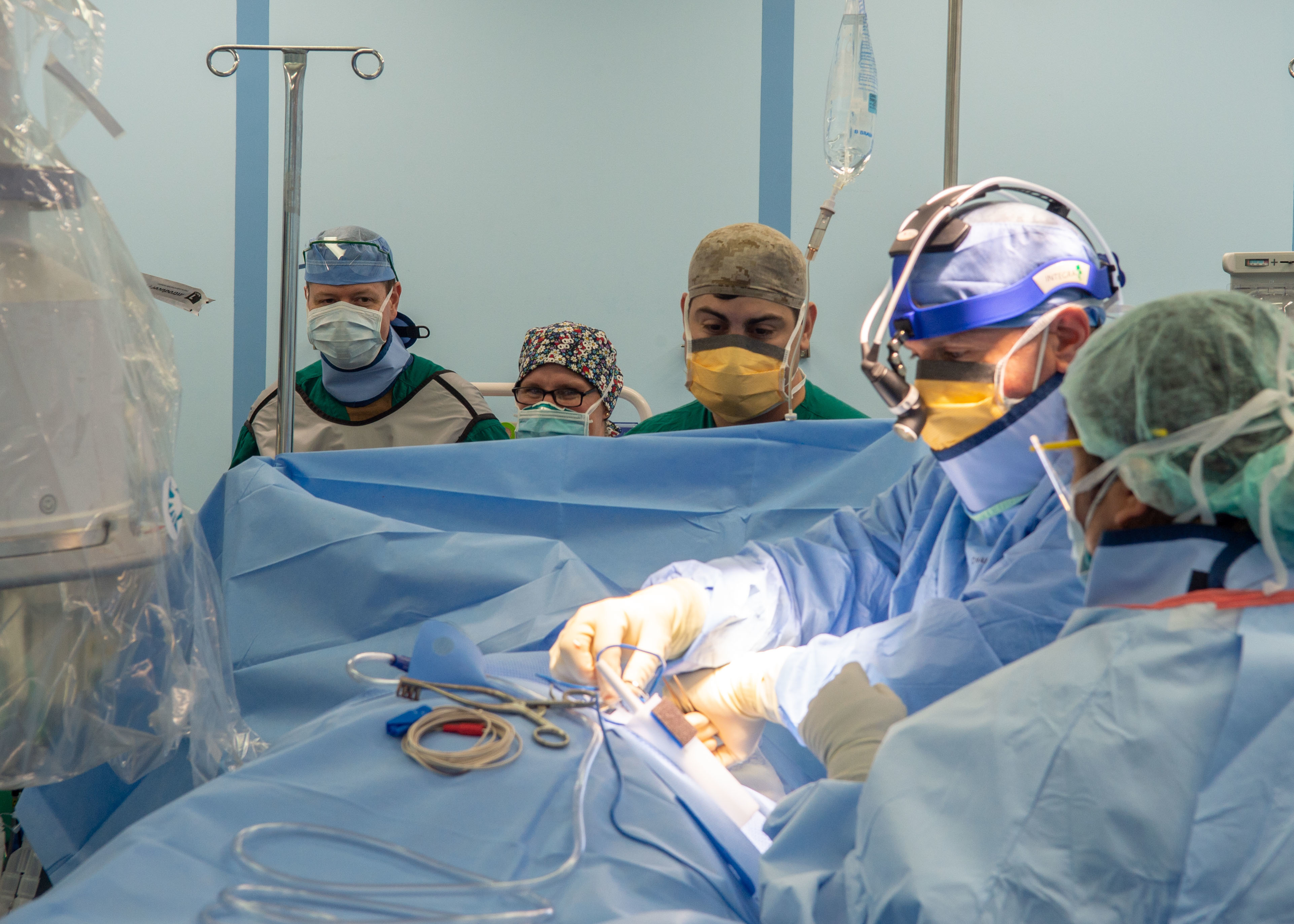
The San Diego–based hospital ship Mercy arrived in Los Angeles in late March to help treat non-coronavirus patients.

=== Exceeded hospital capacity ===
Uncontrolled community spread led some medical facilities to refuse new patients or start transferring patients out. In March and April, this happened in the Detroit, Michigan, area and New York City area; Yakima, Washington, in June; and in July, it happened in Houston, the Boise, Idaho, area, Lake Charles and Lafayette, Louisiana, and at dozens of hospitals across Florida. By August, some hospitals in Mississippi were transferring patients out of state.

Arizona declared crisis standards of care in July 2020, allowing hospitals to legally provide treatment normally considered substandard to some patients in order to save others.

In January 2021, Southern California hospitals began to be overwhelmed with patients. Officials in Los Angeles County, where some ambulances had to wait up to eight hours to discharge patients at emergency rooms, ordered EMTs not to bring a patient to the hospital if that patient had little chance of survival. They also directed crews to take measures to conserve medical oxygen.

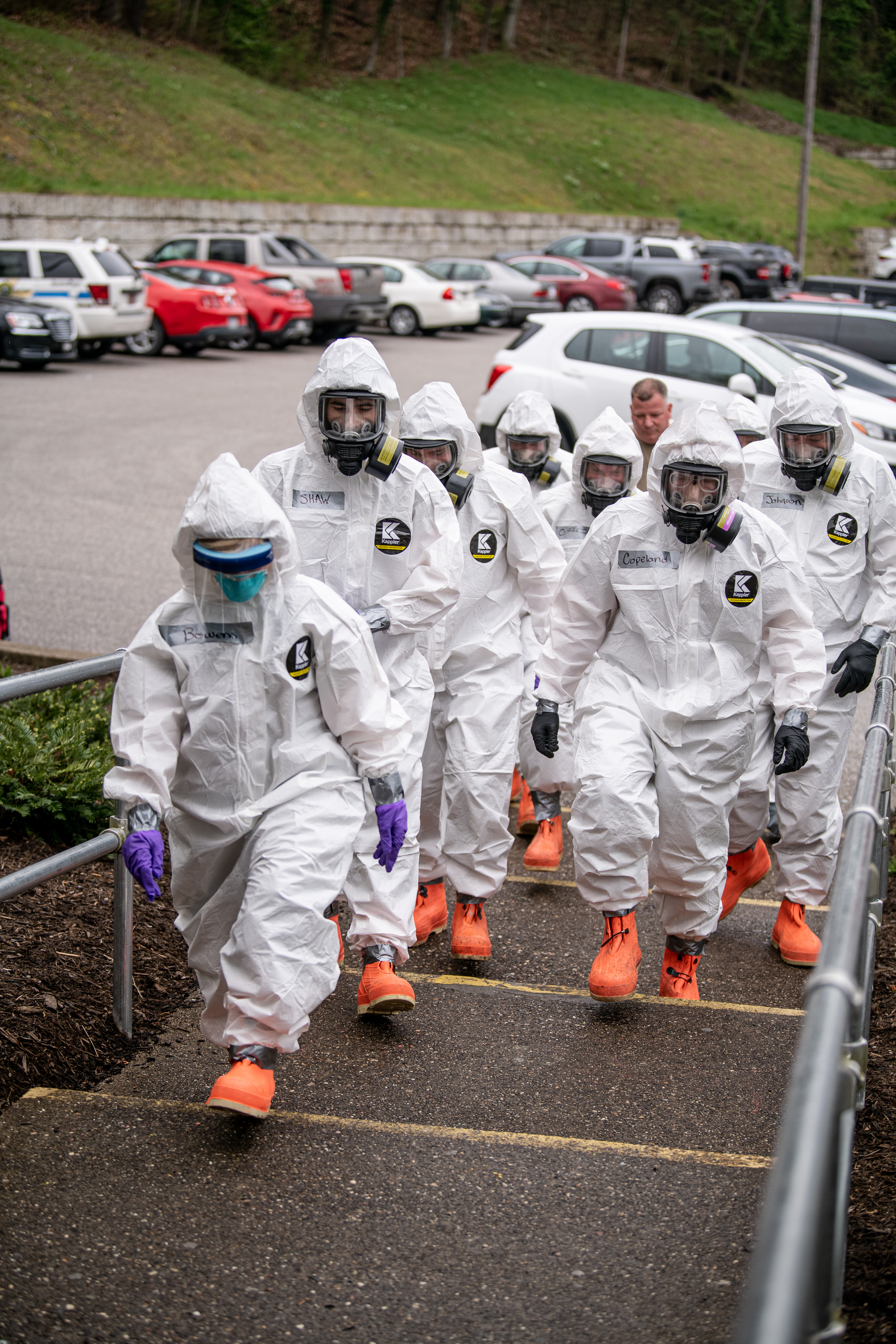
A testing team responds to a confirmed case in a nursing home in Charleston, West Virginia.

== Federal, state, and local governments ==
The federal government of the United States responded to the pandemic with various declarations of emergency, which resulted in travel and entry restrictions. They also imposed guidelines and recommendations regarding the closure of schools and public meeting places, lockdowns, and other restrictions intended to slow the progression of the virus, which state, territorial, tribal, and local governments have followed.

Effective July 15, 2020, the default data centralization point for COVID-19 data in the U.S. switched from the Centers for Disease Control and Prevention to Department of Health and Human Services. However, "hospitals may be relieved from reporting directly to the Federal Government if they receive a written release from the State stating the State will collect the data from the hospitals and take over Federal reporting."

== Military ==
On February 3, an unclassified U.S. Army briefing document on the coronavirus projected that in an unlikely "black swan" scenario, "between 80,000 and 150,000 could die." The theory correctly stated that asymptomatic people could "easily" transmit the virus, a belief that was presented as outside medical consensus at the time of the briefing. The briefing also stated that military forces could be tasked with providing logistics and medical support to civilians, including "provid[ing] PPE (N-95 Face Mask, Eye Protection, and Gloves) to evacuees, staff, and DoD personnel".

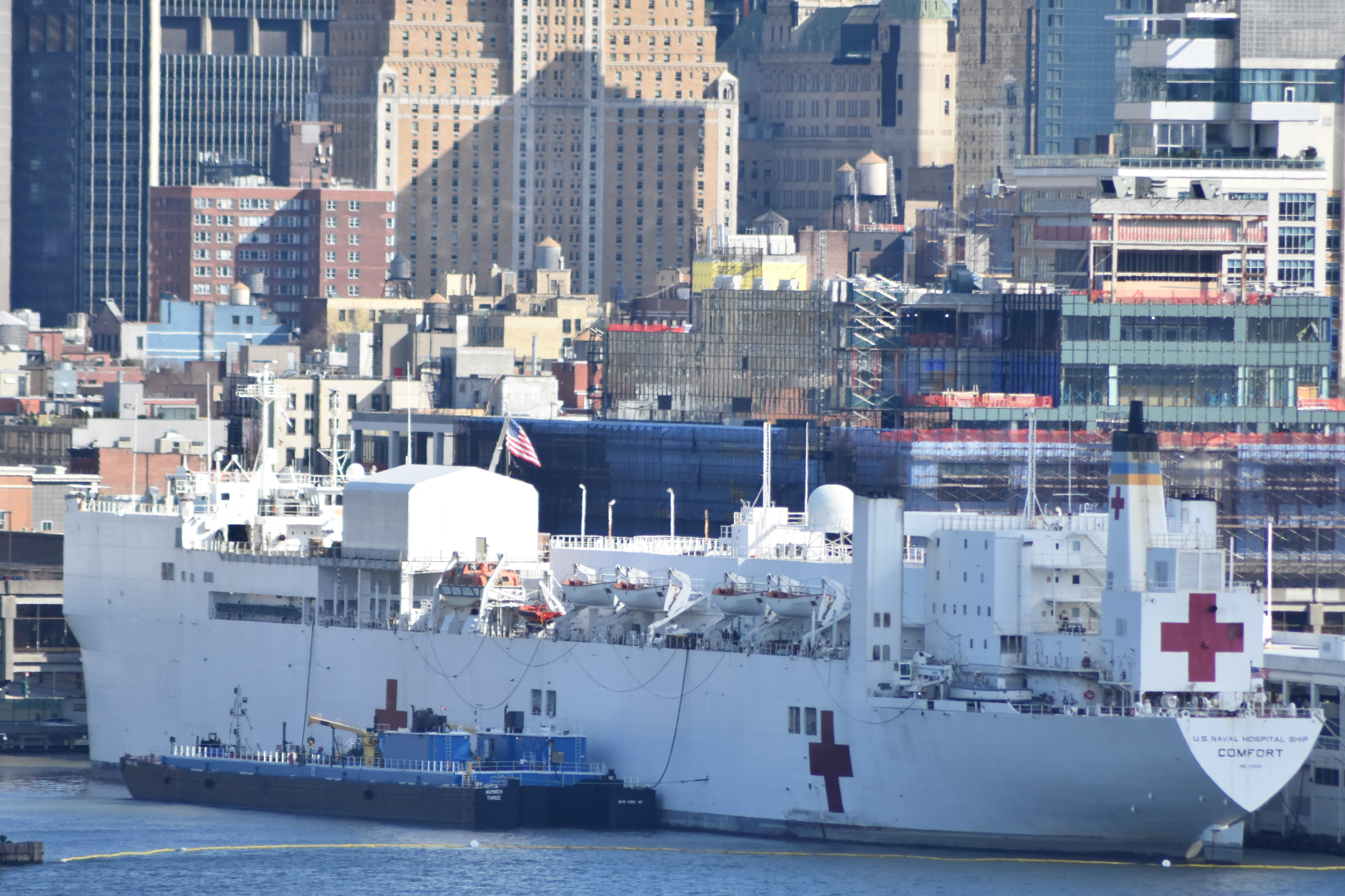
USNS Comfort, docked in Manhattan

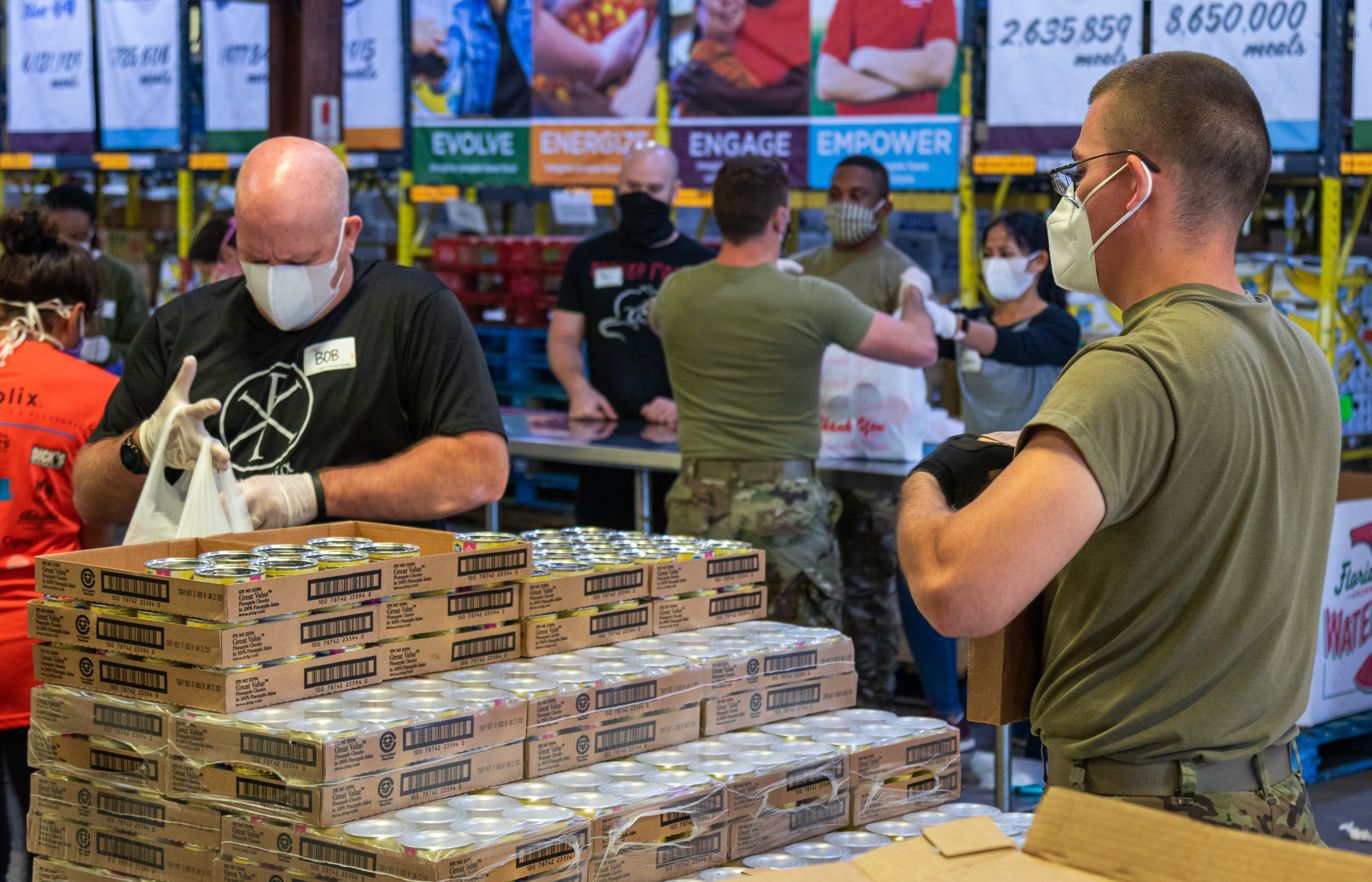
The members of the Florida National Guard support Feed Tampa Bay in their efforts to distribute food to the local community.

In mid-March, the government began having the military add its health care capacity to impacted areas. The United States Army Corps of Engineers (USACE), under the authority of Federal Emergency Management Agency (FEMA), leased private buildings nationwide. They included hotels, college dormitories, and larger open buildings, which were converted into temporary hospitals. The Jacob K. Javits Convention Center in New York City was quickly transformed into a 2,000-bed care facility on March 23, 2020. The Army also set up field hospitals in various affected cities.

Some of these facilities had ICUs for COVID-19 patients, while others served non-coronavirus patients to allow established hospitals to concentrate on the pandemic. At the height of this effort, U.S. Northern Command had deployed nine thousand military medical personnel.

On March 18, in addition to the many popup hospitals nationwide, the Navy deployed two hospital ships, USNS Mercy and USNS Comfort, which were planned to accept non-coronavirus patients transferred from land-based hospitals, so those hospitals could concentrate on virus cases. On March 29, citing reduction in on-shore medical capabilities and the closure of facilities at the Port of Miami to new patients, the U.S. Coast Guard required ships carrying more than fifty people to prepare to care for sick people on board.

On April 6, the Army announced that basic training would be postponed for recruits. Recruits already in training would continue what the Army called "social-distanced-enabled training". However, the military, in general, remained ready for any contingency in a COVID-19 environment. By April 9, nearly 2,000 service members had confirmed cases of COVID-19.

In April, the Army made plans to resume collective training. Social distancing of soldiers is in place during training, assemblies, and transport between locations. Temperatures of the soldiers are taken at identified intervals, and measures are taken to immediately remediate affected soldiers.

On June 26, 2020, the VA reported 20,509 cases of COVID-19 and 1,573 deaths among patients, plus more than two thousand cases and 38 deaths among its own employees. As of July 2020, additional Reserve personnel are on "prepare-to-deploy orders" to Texas and California.

== Private sector ==
Many janitors and other cleaners throughout the United States reported that they were not given adequate time, resources, or training to clean and disinfect institutions for COVID-19. One pilot reported that less than ten minutes was allotted to clean entire airplanes between arrival and departure, which did not allow cleaners to disinfect the tray tables and bathrooms, for which the practice was to wipe down only those that "[look] dirty". Cleaning cloths and wipes were reused, and disinfecting agents, such as bleach, were not provided. Employees also complained that they were not informed if coworkers tested positive for the virus. The Occupational Safety and Health Administration (OSHA), the federal agency that regulates workplace safety and health, investigated a small fraction of these complaints. Mary Kay Henry, president of Service Employees International Union, which represents 375,000 American custodians, explained that "reopenings happened across the country without much thoughtfulness for cleaning standards." She urged better government standards and a certification system.

== Public response ==
=== Partisan divide ===
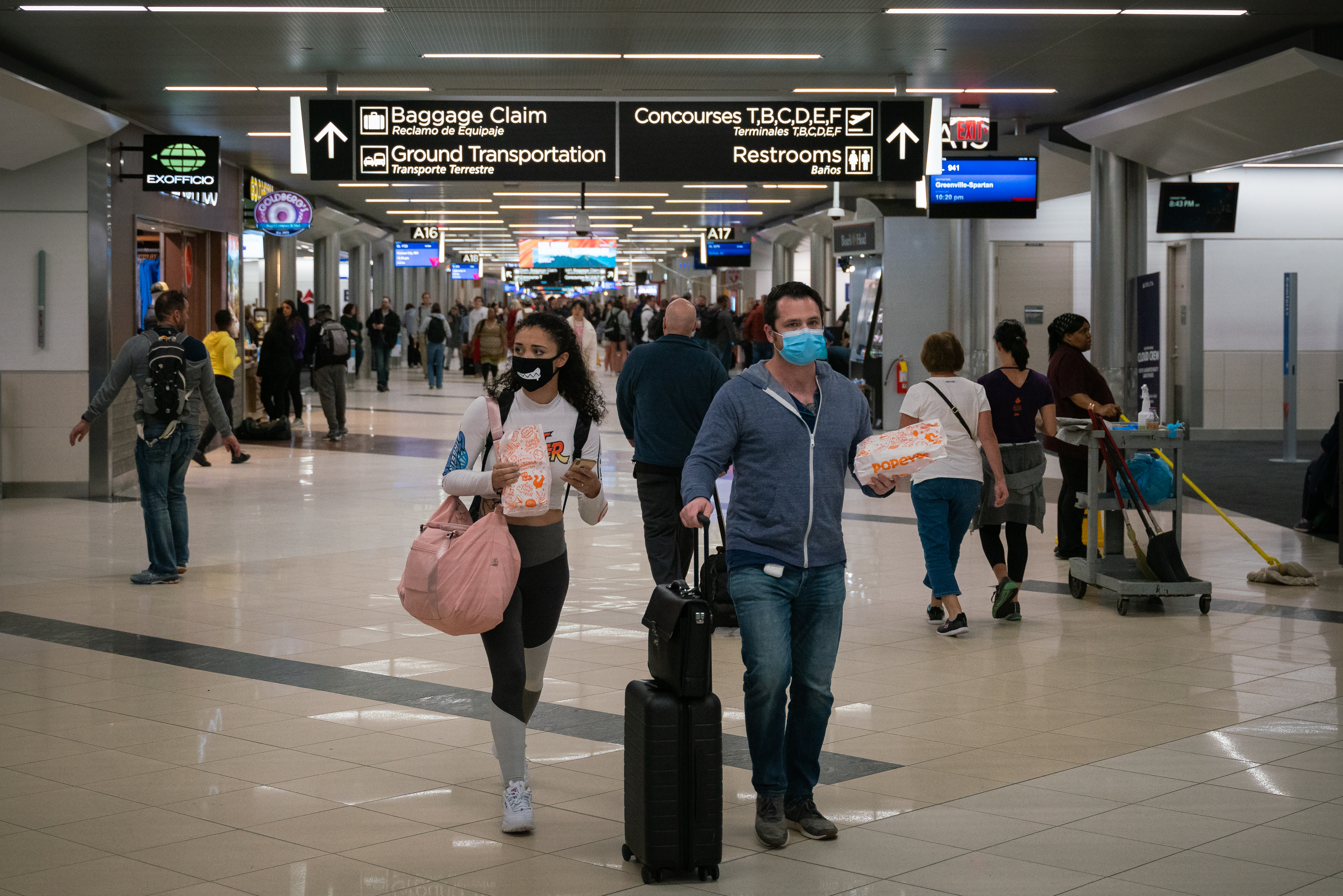
Passengers wearing facemasks at Hartsfield–Jackson Atlanta International Airport

Polling showed a significant partisan divide regarding the outbreak. In February, similar numbers of Democrats and Republicans believed COVID-19 was "a real threat": 70% and 72%, respectively. By mid-March, 76% of Democrats viewed COVID-19 as "a real threat", while only 40% of Republicans agreed. In mid-March, various polls found Democrats were more likely than Republicans to believe "the worst was yet to come" (79–40%), to believe their lives would change in a major way due to the outbreak (56–26%), and to take certain precautions against the virus (83–53%). The CDC was the most trusted source of information about the outbreak (85%), followed by the WHO (77%), state and local government officials (70–71%), the news media (47%), and President Trump (46%).

Political analysts anticipated that the pandemic would negatively affect Trump's chances of re-election. In March 2020, when social distancing practices began, the governors of many states experienced sharp gains in approval ratings. Trump's approval rating increased from 44 to 49 percent in Gallup polls, but it fell to 43% by mid-April. At that time, Pew Research polls indicated that 65% of Americans felt Trump was too slow in taking major steps to respond to the pandemic.

On April 16, Pew Research polls indicated that 32% of Americans worried state governments would take too long to re-allow public activities, while 66% feared the state restrictions would be lifted too quickly. An April 21 poll found a 44% approval rate for the president's handling of the pandemic, compared to 72% approval for state governors. A mid-April poll estimated that President Trump was a source of information on the pandemic for 28% of Americans, while state or local governments were a source for 50% of Americans. 60% of Americans felt Trump was not listening enough to health experts in dealing with the outbreak.

A May 2020 poll concluded that 54% of people in the U.S. felt the federal government was doing a poor job in stopping the spread of COVID-19 in the country. 57% felt the federal government was not doing enough to address the limited availability of COVID-19 testing. 58% felt the federal government was not doing enough to prevent a second wave of COVID-19 cases later in 2020. A poll conducted May 20–21 found that 56% of the American public were "very" concerned about "false or misleading information being communicated about coronavirus", while 30% were "somewhat" concerned. 56% of Democrats said the top source of false or misleading information about the coronavirus was the Trump administration, while 54% of Republicans felt the media was the top source of false or misleading information.

Studies using GPS location data and surveys found that Republicans engaged in less social distancing than Democrats during the pandemic. Controlling for relevant factors, Republican governors were slower to implement social distance policies than Democratic governors. There was a partisan divide over COVID vaccinations, with the counties that voted for Trump in greater shares having lower rates of vaccinations.

=== Protests and public disruptions ===
Beginning in early April 2020, there were protests in several U.S. states against government-imposed lockdowns in response to the COVID-19 pandemic in the United States. The protests, mostly organized by conservative groups and individuals, decried the economic and social impact of stay-at-home orders, business closures, and restricted personal movement and association, and demanded that their respective states be "re-opened" for normal business and personal activity.

The protests made international news and were widely condemned as unsafe and ill-advised, although some political figures expressed support for the protests. They ranged in size from a few hundred people to a few thousand, and spread on social media with encouragement from U.S. President Donald Trump.

By May 1, 2020, there had been demonstrations in more than half of the states; many governors began to take steps to lift the restrictions as daily new infections began decreasing due to social distancing measures.

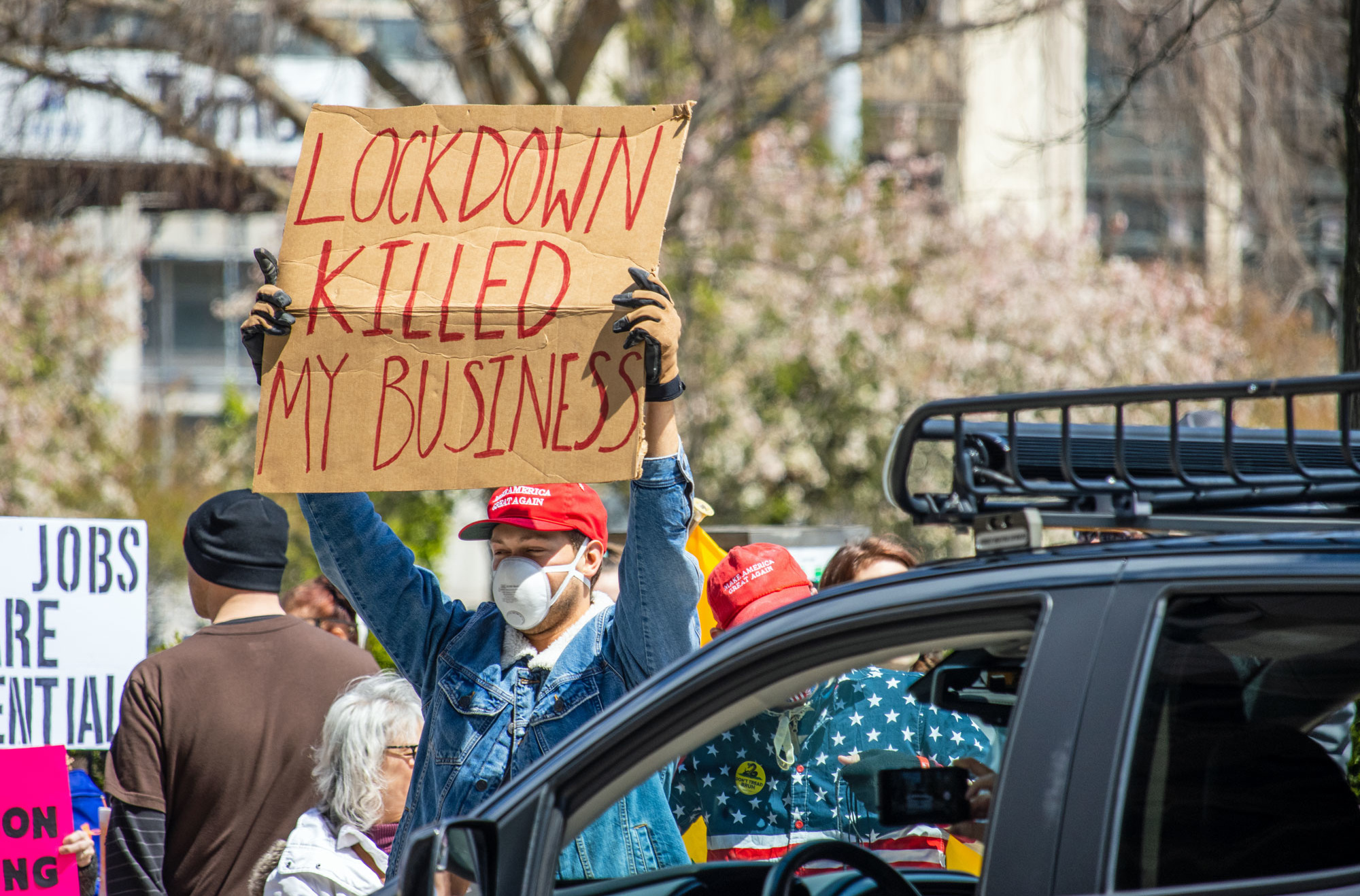
An anti-lockdown protester wearing a face mask at the Ohio Statehouse in April 2020

Starting in late May, large-scale protests against police brutality in at least two hundred U.S. cities in response to the murder of George Floyd raised concerns of a resurgence of the virus due to the close proximity of protesters. Fauci said it could be a "perfect set-up for the spread of the virus", and that "masks can help, but it's masks plus physical separation." One study found an increase in cases, while the Associated Press reported that there was little evidence for such an assertion.

On January 6, 2021, supporters of President Donald Trump stormed the United States Capitol building to disrupt the certification of Joe Biden's electoral victory. At least one activist participated in the riot despite a recent positive COVID-19 diagnosis, and few members of the crowd wore face coverings, with many coming from out of town. A group of maskless Republicans sheltering in place were recorded refusing masks offered by Representative Lisa Blunt Rochester (D-DE), and as many as two hundred congressional staffers reportedly sheltered in various rooms inside the Capitol, further increasing the risk of transmission. Four members of Congress tested positive after sheltering in place with unmasked members of Congress during the January 6 Capitol riot.

=== International views of the United States ===
In September 2020, Pew Research Center found that the global image of the United States had suffered in many foreign nations. In some nations, the United States' favorability rating had reached a record low since Pew began collecting this data nearly twenty years ago. Across thirteen different nations, a median of fifteen percent of respondents rated the U.S. response to the pandemic positively.

=== Other ===
The outbreak prompted calls for the United States to adopt social policies common in other wealthy countries, including universal health care, universal child care, paid sick leave, and higher levels of funding for public health.

== Challenges ==
The American cultural values of individualism and skepticism of government have created difficulties in getting the population to abide by public health directives. The prevalence of pandemic fatigue has resulted in further noncompliance.

Conspiracy theories and misinformation reached millions of Americans through social media and television commentary. As a result, many people believe falsehoods, for example, that wearing masks is dangerous, that a global syndicate planned the virus, or that COVID-19 is a hoax. Facebook announced that it had labeled or deleted 179 million user posts containing COVID-19 misinformation during the first three quarters of 2020. President Trump repeatedly broadcast misinformation to downplay the threat of the virus and to deflect criticism of the administration's response. Trump asserted he did this to "show calm," saying "I don't want to create a panic."
