= 2024 United States drug shortages =

All-time high healthcare and patient drug shortage

In 2024, the United States suffered from an "all-time high" scarcity of over three hundred different kinds of drugs and medications in healthcare and pharmacy settings, surpassing the number of drug shortages present in 2014. Drugs and medications impacted by the shortage included asthma medications, anesthesia and analgesic medications, psychiatric medications for conditions such as ADHD, depression, and bipolar disorder; diabetic medications, injectable sterile drugs, emergency medications stored in rapid response carts, and chemotherapy drugs for cancer patients. Most of the named drug shortages present in the initial April 2024 report were still occurring as of July 2024.

== Background ==
The United States Senate Homeland Security Committee released a report stating that the COVID-19 pandemic had significantly increased scarcity of multiple categories of drugs. Lockdown orders and the necessity of remote working lowered the production and distribution of pharmaceuticals, while decreased trade with China and India for active ingredients further worsened scarcity.

In May 2023, the American Cancer Society released a statement alerting healthcare systems to significant shortages in chemotherapy drugs according to several healthcare professionals and patients. It warned that many of the limited drugs were first-line therapies that did not have any alternatives, which at the minimum could cause treatment delays, leading to worse symptoms, prognosis, and health outcomes for patients depending on the medications.

== Impact ==
The American Society of Health-System Pharmacists (ASHP) reported that 323 "active medication shortages" were reported in January–March 2024. As a result of drug scarcity, many healthcare systems were forced to either ration out essential drugs, triage patients based on the severity of their condition and their need for the drug, or both. Most of the medications impacted by the shortage were generic, low-cost drugs with sterile injectable medications such as chemotherapy agents being the most impacted.

Tornado damage to a pharmaceutical manufacturing plant responsible for a large amount of national injectable drug production exacerbated shortages.

=== List of significant impacted medications ===
The abbreviated list is based on the FDA's Drug Shortages list, updated as of 27 July 2024:

Medication	Therapeutic categories	Shortage reason(s) (Note: Per the Food and Drug Administration Safety and Innovation Act)
Albuterol Sulfate	Pulmonary/Allergy; Pediatric	
Alprostadil	Urology	Shipping delay
Amifostine	Oncology	Discontinuation (Note: Discontinuation of production drug in one or more forms from one or more companies.)
Aminosyn Amino Acid injection	Gastroenterology	Shortage of an active ingredient
Amoxapine	Psychiatric	Other, estimated recovery September 2024
Amoxicillin	Anti-Infective; Pediatric	Increased demand
Amphetamine/Dextroamphetamine	Psychiatric	Shortage of an active ingredient, increased demand
Atropine Sulfate	Anesthesia; Neurology; Pediatric	"Requirements related to complying with good manufacturing practices"
Azacitidine	Oncology	Other
Bumetanide	Cardiovascular	
Bupivacaine Hydrochloride	Anesthesia	Increased demand
Carboplatin	Oncology	"Requirements related to complying with good manufacturing practices", increased demand
Cefotaxime Sodium	Anti-Infective; Pediatric	Increased demand
Cefotetan Disodium	Anti-Infective	Shipping delay, discontinuation from one company
Chloroprocaine HCl	Anesthesia	Increased demand
Clindamycin Phosphate	Anti-Infective	Shipping delay, increased demand
Clonazepam	Neurology; Pediatric; Psychiatry	"Requirements related to complying with good manufacturing practices", increased demand, estimated recovery Oct-Dec. 2024
Conivaptan HCl	Cardiovascular	Shipping delay
Cromolyn Sodium	Respiratory	Increased demand
Cytarabine	Oncology, Pediatric	
Dacarbazine	Oncology	Increased demand
Desmopressin Acetate	Hematology	Increased demand
Dexamethasone	Endocrinology, Rheumatology, Pulmonary/Allergy	Increased demand, shipping delay
Dexmedetomidine HCl	Anesthesia	Discontinuation, increased demand, "Requirements related to complying with good manufacturing practices"
Dextrose Monohydrate Injection	Endocrinology/Metabolism; Gastroenterology; Pediatric	Shipping delay, increased demand
Diltiazem HCl	Cardiovascular	
Dobutamine HCl	Cardiovascular; Pediatric; Renal	Shipping delay
Dopamine HCl	Cardiovascular	Shipping delay, increased demand
Dulaglutide	Endocrinology/Metabolism	Increased demand
Echothiophate Iodide	Ophthalmology	Shipping delay
Epinephrine	Cardiovascular, Pulmonary/Allergy	Increased demand
Fentanyl Citrate	Analgesia/Addiction	Increased demand
Flurazepam HCl	Neurology	Regulatory delay
Furosemide	Cardiovascular	"Requirements related to complying with good manufacturing practices", increased demand
Heparin Sodium	Hematology	Increased demand
Hydrocortisone Sodium Succinate	Pulmonary/Allergy, Endocrinology/Metabolism	Increased demand
Hydromorphone Hydrochloride	Analgesia/Addiction	Shipping delay, increased demand
Hydroxocobalamin	Endocrinology/Metabolism	
Isoniazid	Anti-Infective	Other, Estimated recovery Nov. 2024
Ketamine HCl	Anesthesia	Increased demand, active ingredient shortage
Ketorolac Tromethamine	Analgesia/Addiction	Increased demand
Leucovorin Calcium	Oncology; Pediatric	Shipping delay, increased demand
Lidocaine HCl	Anesthesia; Pediatric	Shipping delay, increased demand
Liraglutide	Endocrinology/Metabolism	Shipping delay, increased demand
Lisdexamfetamine Dimesylate	Psychiatry	Active ingredient shortage
Lorazepam	Neurology	Increased demand
Mefloquine HCl	Anti-Infective	
Methamphetamine HCl	Psychiatry	Active ingredient shortage
Methotrexate Sodium	Oncology	"Requirements related to complying with good manufacturing practices", shipping delay, increased demand
Methylphenidate HCl	Psychiatry	Discontinuation, active ingredient shortage, increased demand
Methylprednisolone Acetate	Rheumatology	Increased demand
Metronidazole	Anti-Infective	Increased demand
Midazolam HCl	Anesthesia; Neurology	Shipping delay, increased demand
Morphine Sulfate	Analgesia/Addiction	Shipping delay, active ingredient shortage
Naltrexone HCl	Analgesia/Addiction	Active ingredient shortage, increased demand
Nitroglycerin	Cardiovascular	Increased demand
Parathyroid Hormone	Endocrinology/Metabolism	Discontinuation
Penicillin G Benzathine	Anti-Infective	Increased demand
Potassium Acetate	Endocrinology/Metabolism; Gastroenterology	Shipping delay, increased demand
Promethazine HCl	Analgesia/Addiction; Gastroenterology; Pediatric; Pulmonary/Allergy	Increased demand
Propranolol HCl	Cardiovascular	Active ingredient shortage, increased demand
Quinapril HCl	Cardiovascular	"Requirements related to complying with good manufacturing practices", shipping delay, discontinuation, active ingredient shortage
Remifentanil HCl	Analgesia/Addiction	Shipping delay, increased demand
Rifampin	Anti-Infective	Shipping delay
Riluzole	Neurology	"Requirements related to complying with good manufacturing practices"
Rocuronium Bromide	Anesthesia	Increased demand
Ropivacaine HCl	Anesthesia	Shipping delay, increased demand
Semaglutide	Endocrinology/Metabolism	Increased demand
Sodium Acetate	Endocrinology/Metabolism; Gastroenterology	Increased demand
Sodium Bicarbonate	Endocrinology/Metabolism; Gastroenterology; Pediatric	Shipping delay, increased demand
Sodium Chloride	Endocrinology/Metabolism; Gastroenterology	Shipping delay, increased demand, discontinuation
Sodium Phosphate	Endocrinology/Metabolism; Gastroenterology	Increased demand
Somatropin	Endocrinology/Metabolism	Shipping delay, increased demand, discontinuation
Sterile Water Injection	Other	"Requirements related to complying with good manufacturing practices"
Streptozocin	Oncology	Other
Sucralfate	Gastroenterology	Increased demand
Sufentanil Citrate	Analgesia/Addiction; Pediatric	Shipping delay, increased demand
Technetium TC-99M Pyrophosphate	Medical imaging	Active ingredient shortage
Triamcinolone	Rheumatology	Shipping delay
Valproate Sodium	Neurology	
Vecuronium Bromide	Anesthesia	Increased demand
Vinblastine Sulfate	Oncology	Increased demand

=== ADHD medication ===
CEO of the ASHP Dr. Paul Abramowitz reported that shortages in Adderall medication developed to a point where they were "demand-driven".

Shortages beginning in October 2022 were caused or exacerbated by limited prescriptions amounts controlled by the Drug Enforcement Administration, coupled with over-diagnosis of ADHD and overprescription of Adderall. Scarcity continued in 2024 as a result of continually increased demand and supply chain problems, despite increases in production and distribution of Adderall. Patients and healthcare providers have expressed concerns about the impact on treatment plans for ADHD and narcolepsy, as many individuals rely on this medication for managing their symptoms.

== Causes ==
The American Cancer Society noted that several factors contributed to escalating nationwide drug shortages, which included decreased or restricted drug manufacturing capacity, increased drug demands coupled with corresponding shortages in supplies, and lower profit margins for several generic drugs decreasing corporate desires towards creating surpluses. The organization also noted that the Food and Drug Administration's means to prevent drug shortages were fundamentally centered around contact with the drug manufacturers involved, giving early warnings that requested them to increase production instead of directly pushing for specific drug quotas.

The ASHP reported that one of the main causes of continuous severe shortages was due to "extreme price competition" between generic drug manufacturers. Challenges to quick-enough production of high-quality medications coupled with possible supply chain disruptions pushed many of these companies to shift their manufacturing to producing drugs with higher profit margins, with some completely stopping production of less lucrative drugs. The organization also pointed out the role that difficult and multi-year federal regulatory approval processes for new manufacturers played in lowering the number of new drug manufacturers and resulting supply decreases. Generic drug user fees noted in section 506C(g) of the Federal Food Drug and Cosmetics Act further made it difficult for companies to keep their businesses profitable.

U.S. Representatives Gary Peters (D-MI) and Iowa Republican Senator Joni Ernst emphasized the role of supply chain breakdowns and weak points in medication shortages. They also argued that U.S. "over-reliance" on foreign nations for key ingredients would lead to future shortages out of American control, especially for dependence on "foreign adversaries" and "bad actors", with China named as an example. Dr. Stephen Schondelmeyer further stated that while the number of pharmaceutical production facilities in the United States was cut in half since 2014, the numbers of pharmaceutical plants were steadily growing in several countries such as Taiwan, India, Israel, and China. He reported that China and India's conditions for pharmaceutical production were greatly enhanced by having less environmental regulations and cheaper labor.

== Mitigation efforts ==
The ASHP recommended expedited reviews for new generic drug manufacturing companies, and recommended regular and publicly released inspection reports to provide purchasers with information on present difficulties or issues in manufacturing, and to inform buyers of companies with production or compliance issues. It also recommended amendments to Section 510(j) of the Federal Food, Drug, and Cosmetics Act to introduce non-negligible penalties on drug manufacturers that lack plans for managing production or supply chain difficulties and who do not keep track of or release data related to production and supply chain metrics.

The United States Department of Health and Human Services adopted these recommendations in a white paper outlining policy proposals for future laws and amendments. The paper also recommended penalties for hospitals that did not follow "HHS-required inventory and purchasing practices", which the ASHP stating that such penalties could negatively impact lesser-financed hospitals more susceptible to drug shortages by preventing them from investing in means to mitigate shortages.
