= Prestige Ameritech =

American manufacturer of surgical masks and respirators

- Industry: Manufacturing
- Founded: 2005
- Founder: Dan Reese
- Headquarters: North Richland Hills, Texas
- Products: Surgical masks Respirators
- Website: prestigeameritech.com/home

Prestige Ameritech is an American manufacturer of surgical masks and respirators based in North Richland Hills, Texas. The company produced over a million surgical masks per day during the height of the 2009 swine flu pandemic and rose to prominence again during the COVID-19 pandemic.

== History ==
Prestige Ameritech was founded in 2005 by Dan Reese and Mike Bowen.

According to a whistleblower complaint by Rick Bright, former director of the Biomedical Advanced Research and Development Authority (BARDA), Prestige Ameritech offered to provide masks in January 2020 but was rebuffed by the Trump administration. Executive Vice President Michael Bowen noted that in the event of a "dire situation", his company could increase production by 1.7 million N95 masks per week by reactivating four N95 manufacturing lines in "like-new" condition at significant cost, but would require a major financial commitment from the government. White House economic adviser Peter Navarro said that "the company was just extremely difficult to work and communicate with."

Ultimately FEMA took over mask acquisition for the government in March, during which Prestige submitted a bid. Bowen went on former White House Chief Strategist Steve Bannon's "War Room" podcast to press his case, and on April 7 Prestige won a $9.5 million FEMA contract to produce a million N95 masks per month over a period of one year at 79 cents apiece, a pace that did not require the company to restart its idle manufacturing lines. This deal was criticized as evidence of favoritism by the Trump administration, as this was only the second time in FEMA's history that a contract was awarded due to direct intervention by the president.
