= List of modes of mechanical ventilation by category =

Modes of mechanical ventilation has only had an established nomenclature since 2008. It is suggested that the modes categorized under the following sections be referred to as their section header instead of their individual name, which is often a brand name instead of the preferred nomenclature.

== Volume controlled continuous mandatory ventilation ==
- Volume controlled continuous mandatory ventilation (VC-CMV - formerly known as assist control)

== Volume controlled intermittent mandatory ventilation ==
- Synchronized intermittent mechanical ventilation (SIMV)
- Mandatory minute ventilation (MMV)

== Pressure controlled continuous mandatory ventilation ==
- Pressure controlled continuous mandatory ventilation (PC-CMV) formerly known as simply pressure control ventilation.

== Pressure controlled intermittent mandatory ventilation ==
- Airway pressure release ventilation (APRV)
- Pressure regulated volume control (PRVC)
- Proportional assist ventilation (PAV)
- Adaptive support ventilation (ASV)

== Continuous spontaneous ventilation ==
- Continuous positive pressure ventilation (CPPV or sometimes C_{pap}.)
- Bilevel positive pressure ventilation (BPAP or sometimes, though unrecommended "BiPap".)

== Strategies of mechanical ventilation ==
Strategies are not modes of mechanical ventilation but are instead strategies for using modes.

- Inverse ratio ventilation
- Open lung ventilation
