= Nomenclature of mechanical ventilation =

Terminology of mechanical respiration

The nomenclature of mechanical ventilation in the respiration of patients in medical treatment varies widely across associated hardware and modes of operation, with some terms specific to device brand, model, trademark, or mode of mechanical ventilation. While there is a standardized nomenclature of mechanical ventilation for modes, this is not the case for settings and variables. However, these terms can be categorized using a schema that combines control variables, breath sequences, and targeting schemes.

The target variable should not be confused with the cycle variable or the control variable. The target variable only sets an upper limit for pressure, volume, or flow. The term trigger (commonly flow or pressure) denotes the criterion that starts inspiration, and cycle denotes the criterion that stops it.

== Control variables ==
The control variable is the physical parameter that controls the breath in accordance with the equation of motion: i.e. Pressure = Elastance*Volume + Resistance*Flow.

=== Volume control (VC) ===
Volume controlled ventilation is ventilation where both volume and flow are controlled by the ventilator. Normally flow is set to a fixed amount, meaning volume increases linearly over time.

Any mode that relies on flow to control inspiration falls under the VC-(insert mode of ventilation) category.

=== Pressure control (PC) ===
Pressure controlled ventilation is ventilation where pressure as a function of time is controlled by the ventilator. Normally pressure is set to a specific amount for a specific breath duration, letting volume and flow vary according to patient demands.

Any mode that relies on pressure to deliver a breath falls under the PC-(insert mode of ventilation) category.

=== Time control (TC) ===
Purely time controlled ventilation can be used, although rarely, as for example in intrapulmonary percussive ventilation. In this type of ventilation only time is set by the operator, and pressure and flow change in line with the equation of motion.

Any mode that relies on time to deliver a breath falls under the TC-(insert mode of ventilation) category.

== Breath sequences ==
=== Continuous mandatory ventilation (CMV) ===
CMV is a form of ventilation where the ventilator can assist or control itself dynamically, depending on the transient presence or absence of spontaneous breathing effort by the patient.

The following terms have been replaced by the VC-CMV category, as defined above.

- Assist/Control
- A/C
- ACV
- CMV
- Volume Assist/Control
- Volume Control
- Volume Limited Ventilation
- Volume Controlled Ventilation
- Controlled Ventilation
- Volume Targeted Ventilation

The following terms have been replaced by the PC-CMV category, as defined above.

- Assist/Control
- A/C
- ACV
- CMV
- Pressure Assist/Control
- Pressure Control
- Pressure Limited Ventilation
- Pressure Controlled Ventilation
- Pressure Targeted Ventilation

=== Intermittent mandatory ventilation (IMV) ===
IMV is a form of ventilation where the ventilator delivers mandatory breaths, but spontaneous breaths are possible between mandatory breaths. Mandatory breaths can be delivered at a set frequency with spontaneous breaths occurring in between, or can be delivered whenever breath volume per minute falls below a set point.

The following terms have been replaced by the VC-IMV category, as defined above.

- Synchronized Intermittent Mandatory Ventilation
- SIMV

The following terms have been replaced by the PC-IMV category, as defined above.

- Synchronized Intermittent Mandatory Ventilation
- SIMV

=== Continuous spontaneous ventilation (CSV) ===
Continuous spontaneous ventilation is a form of ventilation where all breaths in the breath sequence are spontaneous.

The following terms are no longer in use:

- spont
- spontaneous

== Targeting schemes ==
=== Mandatory breath ===
Mandatory breath is a breath type during mechanical ventilation in which inspiration is machine triggered and/or machine cycled.

Terms no longer in use

The following terms are no longer in use:

- machine breath
- mechanical breath

=== Spontaneous breath ===
Spontaneous breath is a breath type during mechanical ventilation in which inspiration is both patient triggered and patient cycled. It applies to assisted or unassisted breathing.

=== Assisted ventilation or breath ===
Assisted ventilation or assisted breath is a breath type during mechanical ventilation in which a machine provides some or all of the work of breathing.

The following terms are no longer in use:

- patient triggered ventilation
- patient triggered breath

=== Patient triggered breath ===
Patient triggered breath is a breath that is initiated by the patient, independent of ventilator settings for frequency.

The following terms are no longer in use:

- patient assisted breath
- assisted breath

=== Autotriggering ===
Autotriggering is the unintended initiation of breath delivery by the ventilator, due to an external disturbance such as movement of the breathing tube or an inappropriate trigger sensitivity setting.

The following term is no longer in use:

- autocycling

=== Other terms relevant to targeting schemes ===
- Set point – e.g. PC-CSVs is the tag for pressure support.
- Adaptive – e.g. in PC-IMVa, a is the tag for VC+.
- Optimal – e.g. in PC-IMVoi, oi is the tag for Adaptive Support Ventilation (ASV) when due only to minor safety algorithms – if not it would only be "optimal" but not "intelligent".
- Dual – e.g. VC-CMVd is the tag for CMV + pressure limited ventilation.
- Biovariable – e.g. PC-CSVb is the tag for Variable Pressure Support.
- Servo – e.g. PC-CSVr is the tag for NAVA.
- Intelligent – e.g. PC-IMVoi is the tag for Adaptive Support Ventilation (ASV) and for INTELLiVent-ASV.

== Non-standardized terminology ==
The following are terms that are included in modes of mechanical ventilation but are not yet included in the standardized nomenclature.

=== Volume related ===
- V_{t} – Tidal volume
- V_{e} – Minute ventilation
- Amplitude – High-frequency ventilation (Active)

=== Pressure related ===
- P_{ip} – Peak inspiratory pressure
- P_{plat} – Plateau pressure (airway)
- M_{paw} – Mean airway pressure
- E_{PAP} – Pressure applied to exhalation
- I_{PAP} – Pressure applied to inhalation
- P_{high} – Highest pressure attained, similar to P_{ip}. This is a constant pressure.
- P_{low} – Pressure that P_{high} drops to during expiratory time (T_{low}).
- PEEP – Positive end-expiratory pressure. Pressure created by a backpressure valve.
- C_{PAP} – Continuous positive airway pressure
- Δ_{p} – Delta-P, the change in pressure from the highest pressure to the lowest pressure.
- PS – Pressure Support

=== Time related ===
- I:E – Inspiratory : Expiratory ratio
- T_{high} – Time set for inhalation
- T_{low} – Time set for exhalation
- iT – Inspiratory Time
