= Pressure-controlled ventilation =

Pressure-controlled ventilation may refer to:

- Pressure-controlled continuous mandatory ventilation
- Pressure-controlled intermittent mandatory ventilation

== See also ==
- Mechanical ventilation
- Modes of mechanical ventilation
- Respiratory therapy
