= ΔP =

ΔP (Delta P) is a mathematical term symbolizing a change (Δ) in pressure (P).

== Uses ==
- Young–Laplace equation

=== Darcy–Weisbach equation ===
Given that the head loss h_{f} expresses the pressure loss Δp as the height of a column of fluid,

$$\Delta p = \rho \cdot g \cdot h_f$$

where ρ is the density of the fluid. The Darcy–Weisbach equation can also be written in terms of pressure loss:

$$\Delta p = f \cdot \frac{L}{D} \cdot \frac{\rho V^2}{2}$$

=== Lung compliance ===
In general, compliance is defined by the change in volume (ΔV) versus the associated change in pressure (ΔP), or ΔV/ΔP:

$$Compliance =  \frac{ \Delta V}{ \Delta P}$$

During mechanical ventilation, compliance is influenced by three main physiologic factors:

1. Lung compliance
2. Chest wall compliance
3. Airway resistance

Lung compliance is influenced by a variety of primary abnormalities of lung parenchyma, both chronic and acute. Airway resistance is typically increased by bronchospasm and airway secretions. Chest wall compliance can be decreased by fixed abnormalities (e.g. kyphoscoliosis, morbid obesity) or more variable problems driven by patient agitation while intubated.

Calculating compliance on minute volume (V_{E}: ΔV is always defined by tidal volume (V_{T}), but ΔP is different for the measurement of dynamic vs. static compliance.

==== Dynamic compliance (C_{dyn}) ====
$$C_{dyn} = \frac{V_T}\mathrm{PIP-PEEP}$$

where PIP = peak inspiratory pressure (the maximum pressure during inspiration), and PEEP = positive end expiratory pressure. Alterations in airway resistance, lung compliance and chest wall compliance influence C_{dyn}.

==== Static compliance (C_{stat}) ====
$$C_{stat} = \frac{{V_T}}{{P_{plat}-PEEP}}$$

where P_{plat} = plateau pressure. P_{plat} is measured at the end of inhalation and prior to exhalation using an inspiratory hold maneuver. During this maneuver, airflow is transiently (~0.5 sec) discontinued, which eliminates the effects of airway resistance. P_{plat} is never > PIP and is typically < 3-5 cmH_{2}O lower than PIP when airway resistance is normal.

== See also ==
- Pressure measurement
- Pressure drop
- Head loss
