= ASV =

ASV may refer to:

== Organizations ==
- American Society for Virology
- Association of Shelter Veterinarians
- Astronomical Society of Victoria, Australia
- Asociación de Scouts de Venezuela, the Scouts Association of Venezuela
- Armeesportvereinigung Vorwärts, a former East Germany military sports club

== Scientific terms ==
- Adaptive support ventilation, a mode of ventilation for critical care patients
- Anodic stripping voltammetry, a voltammetric method for quantitative determination of specific ionic species
- Amplicon sequence variant, a term used to refer to individual DNA sequences recovered from a high-throughput marker gene analysis
- Adaptive servo-ventilation, a treatment for sleep apnea

== Vehicle terms ==
- Armored security vehicle
- Autonomous surface vehicle
- Air-to-surface-vessel radar (also "anti-surface vessel"), aircraft-mounted radars used to find ships and submarines

== Locations ==
- Vatican Secret Archives (Archivum Secretum Vaticanum)
- Ascot Vale railway station, Melbourne
- Aberdeen Sports Village, a sports facility in Aberdeen, Scotland

== Other uses ==
- American Standard Version, a 1901 translation of the Bible
- United States of America (in Latvian, Amerikas Savienotās Valstis)
- ASV Records, UK record label
