= Volume-controlled ventilation =

Volume-controlled ventilation may refer to:

- Volume controlled continuous mandatory ventilation
- Volume controlled intermittent mandatory ventilation

== See also ==
- Mechanical ventilation
- Modes of mechanical ventilation
- Respiratory therapy
