= Inverse ratio ventilation =

Inverse ratio ventilation (IRV) is not necessarily a mode of mechanical ventilation though it may be referred to as such. IRV is a strategy (method or style) of ventilating the lungs in such a way that the amount of time the lungs are in inhalation is greater than the amount of time they are in exhalation, allowing for a constant inflation of the lungs, ensuring they remain "recruited" (meaning they participate in gas exchange and are not allowed to deflate to get stuck together or tighten up). The primary goal for IRV is improved oxygenation by forcing inspiratory time to be greater than expiratory time (example: inhale is 3 seconds and exhalation is 1 second, a 3:1 I:E ratio) increasing the mean airway pressure and potentially improving oxygenation. Normal I:E ratio is 5:6, so forcing the I:E to be 2:1, 3:1, 4:1, (or even as high as 20:1) is the source of the term for the strategy.

IRV has not often been shown to improve important clinical outcomes, such as mortality, duration of mechanical ventilation, or duration of ICU stay. This may be due to the fact that IRV is not considered as a mode early enough once ARDS is diagnosed. The preponderance of evidence suggests that IRV improves oxygenation, although the evidence is weak and characterized by low quality, conflicting studies.

== Types ==
IRV can be performed during pressure-controlled ventilation (PC-IRV) or volume-controlled ventilation(VC-IRV). Neither is clearly superior to the other. In a multicenter, randomized trial that compared PC-IRV to VC-IRV in patients with acute respiratory distress syndrome, the type of IRV did not affect mortality.

== Associated risk ==
The shorter expiratory time during IRV increases the risk of auto-PEEP and its associated development of problems (e.g. pulmonary barotrauma, hypotension). IRV also appears to increase the risk of pulmonary barotrauma independent of auto-PEEP. In a study of 14 patients undergoing mechanical ventilation with PC-IRV, the incidence of pneumothorax was 29 percent despite the lack of measurable auto-PEEP.

== Modes that utilize IRV ==
The most popular mode that utilizes IRV is the airway pressure release ventilation mode, also known by the brand name "BiVent". This employs an extremely high inverse ratio in a continuous pressure system similar to biphasic positive airway pressure but with several additional variables.
