= Open-source ventilator =

Ventilator of freely-licensed design

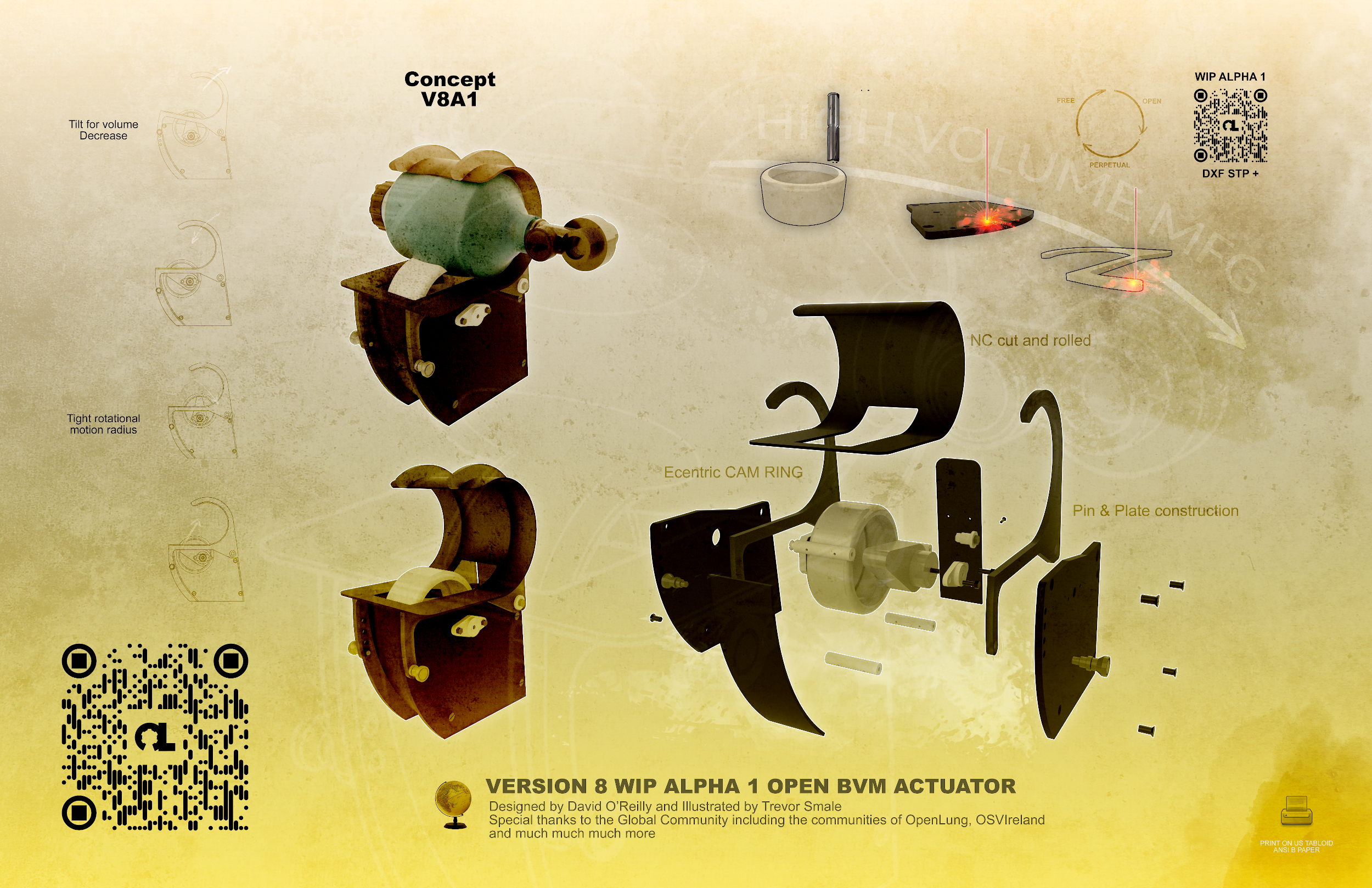
The Open Source Ventilator's OpenLung project, an open source, low-resource, quick-deployment mechanical ventilator design utilizes a bag valve mask (BVM or Ambu-bag) as a core component.

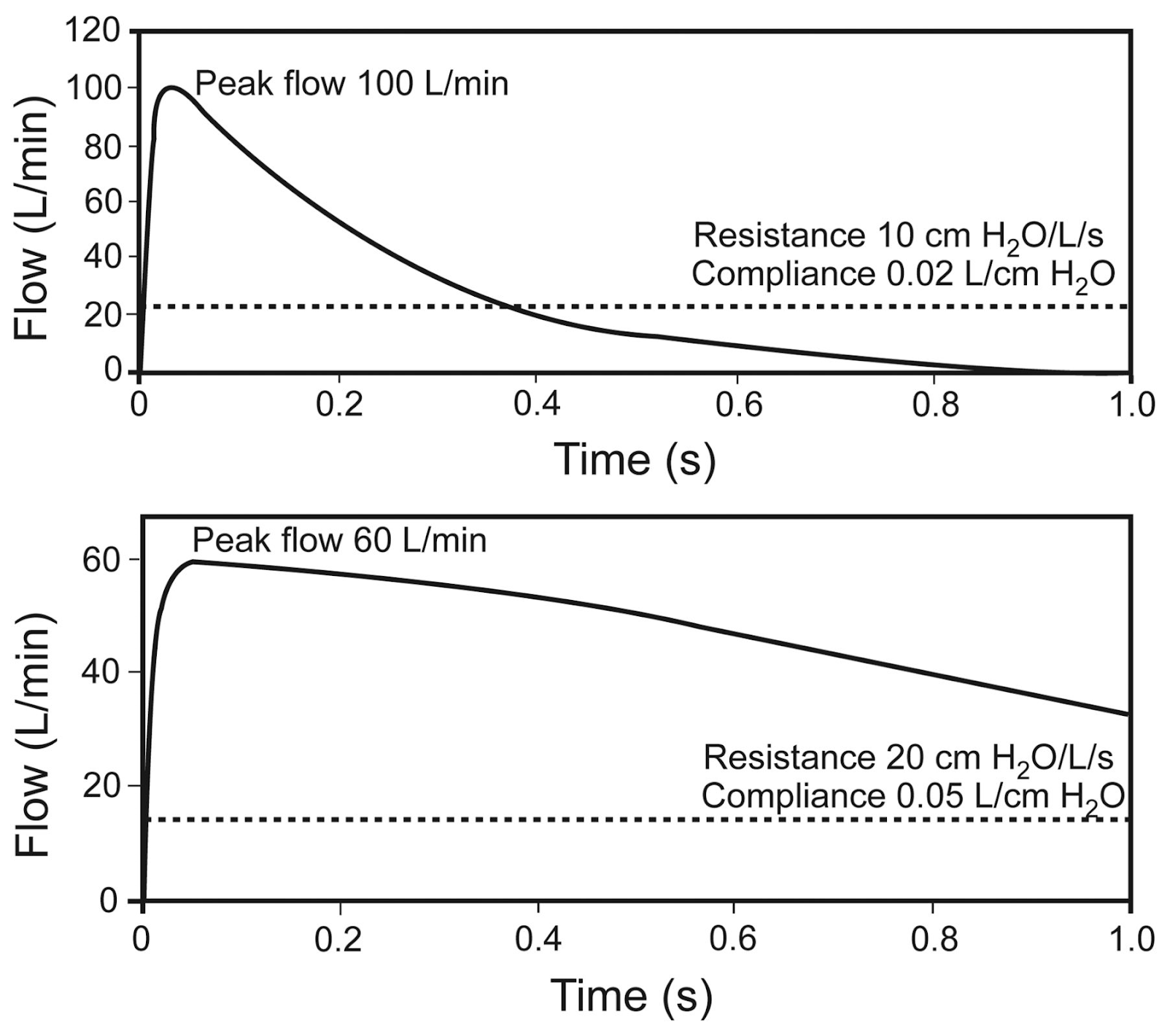
Mechanics of the OpenLung ventilator

An open source ventilator is a disaster-situation ventilator made using a freely licensed (open-source) design, and ideally, freely available components and parts (open source hardware). Designs, components, and parts may be anywhere from completely reverse-engineered or completely new creations, components may be adaptations of various inexpensive existing products, and special hard-to-find and/or expensive parts may be 3D-printed instead of purchased. As of early 2020, the levels of documentation and testing of open source ventilators was well below scientific and medical-grade standards.

One small, early prototype effort was the Pandemic Ventilator created in 2008 during the resurgence of H5N1 avian influenza that began in 2003, so named "because it is meant to be used as a ventilator of last resort during a possible avian (bird) flu pandemic."

== Quality assessment ==
The policy of using both free and open source software (FOSS) and open source hardware theoretically allows community-wide peer-review and correction of bugs and faults in open source ventilators, which is not available in closed source hardware development. In early 2020 during the COVID-19 pandemic, a review of open source ventilators stated that "the tested and peer-reviewed systems lacked complete documentation and the open systems that were documented were either at the very early stages of design ... and were essentially only basically tested ..." The author speculated that the pandemic would motivate development that would significantly improve the open source ventilators, and that much work, policies, regulations, and funding would be needed for the open source ventilators to achieve medical-grade standards.

== Design requirements ==
A number of features are required for an invasive mechanical ventilator to be safely used on a patient:

- a way of measuring and controlling the volume pumped and the breath rate to avoid volutrauma;
- monitoring for inspiratory pressure, respiratory rate (bpm), and inspiratory-to-expiratory time (I/E) ratio
- for non-sedated patients, an "assist" mode that, instead of forcing air in at a fixed frequency, only increases the pressure when the patient inhales;
- for ARDS, support for setting positive end-expiratory pressure (PEEP) to avoid alveoli collapse;
- humidification to avoid drying and cooling the alveoli.

The requirements for non-invasive ventilation are less strict.

== COVID-19 pandemic ==
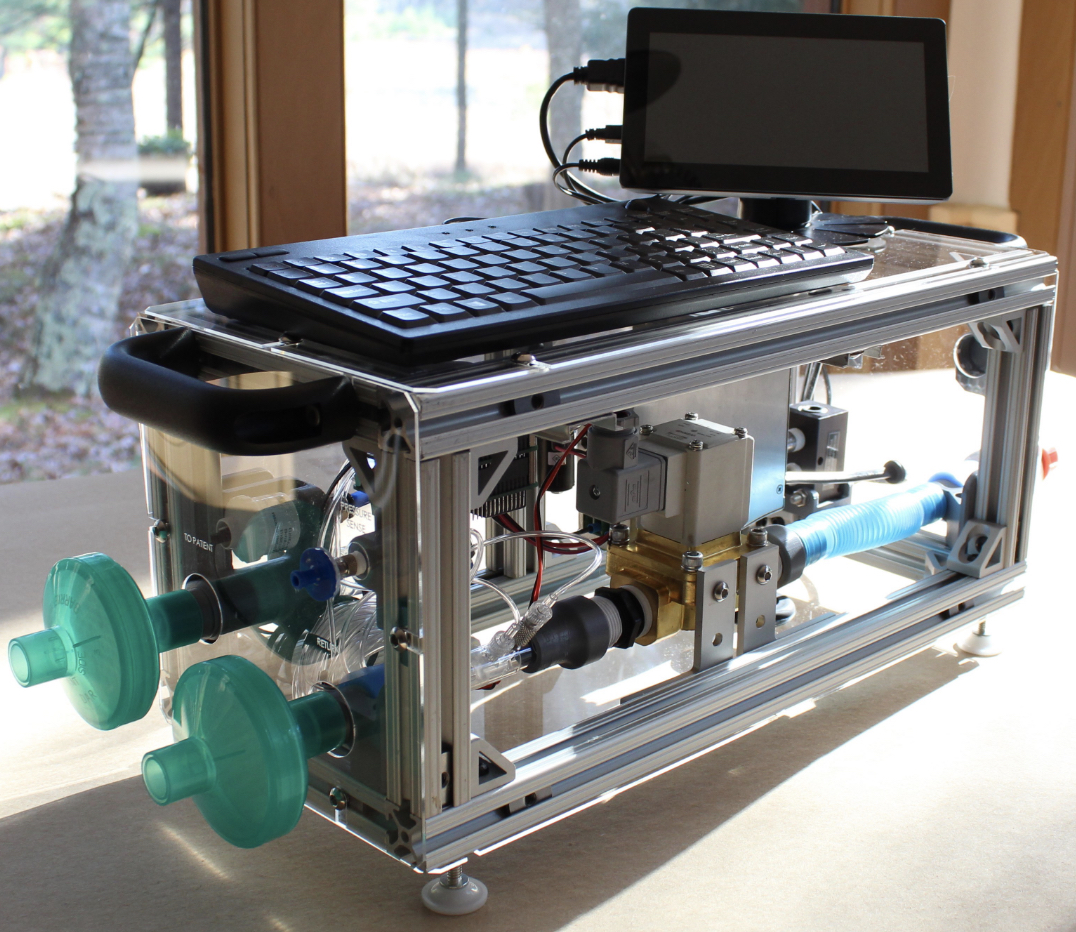
Born of urgency, numerous alternative and open design ventilators were developed during the COVID-19 pandemic. These cheaper alternatives shown various balances between complete reproduction of state of the art medical ventilators with pressure curve, humidification, mechanisation, vitals monitoring, cost effectiveness, supply chain availability for parts in time of medical shortage, ease of assembly, and other aspects.

On March 16, 2020, the Open Source Ventilator Ireland (OSV) group was formed initially with the goal of building a focus team in Ireland to begin development on what was termed the "Field Emergency Ventilator (FEV)". Inspired by the initial efforts of the Open Source Medical Supplies (OSCMS), which initially focused on developing open ventilators but quickly refocusing mainly on the local production of Personal Protective Experiment (PPE). OSV Ireland partnered with the OpenLung team in Canada, who were developing and publishing open source designs via GitLab. The group quickly grew amassing volunteer engineers, designers and medical professionals with the goal of developing new, low resource medical interventions to support a perceived lack of mechanical ventilation equipment globally. The well-known Bag Valve Mask (BVM) quickly became the core functional component of their design, with the goal of utilizing 3D printed and traditionally manufactured components for localized assembly of the systems to maximise potential manufacturing capabilities around the globe. The Open Source Ventilator Ireland (OSV) group evolved into TeamOSV, to fully incorporate both ventilator and other covid related medical equipment.

The FOSS Initiative OpenVentilator.io project began on March 19, after two weeks of research. Jeremias Almadas had posted some drafts he made on the Open Source COVID-19 Medical Supplies forum. Marcos Mendez contacted him to join efforts to develop a solution that could be reproduced on a very high scale. This project later became the "OpenVentilator Spartan Model".

Ventilators have been manufactured since the 1960s, with models like the Bird MK VII. During the COVID-T19 pandemic, the OpenVentilator.io project sought to scale its manufacturing process globally, using parts found in small towns and villages.

On March 18, Medtronic had opened its code and files for manufacturing its main pulmonary ventilation equipment. The issue was on a scale that Medtronic would not be able to fulfill at the global level, nor at the regional level. The same was already happening with Philips, GE and Drager, world leaders in the manufacture of this type of equipment. It would not make sense to reinvent something that had already been studied for 100 years. The problem was also not an engineering problem, but a logistical and scale problem so that these projects that were to emerge were applicable and achievable. Manufacturing should be decentralized, focused on the regional resources of each individual on planet earth. Nine out of ten Brazilian cities do not even have an ICU bed, let alone an electronics store and or an Ambu factory. The African situation had already been proclaimed a catastrophe.

Several projects are beginning to emerge in this area, many of them with an engineering approach, many others following strict validations with the regulations.

There are few projects that have an [analysis of complex thinking within the global economic-political stagnation.

A major worldwide design effort began during the COVID-19 pandemic after a Hackaday project was started, in order to respond to expected ventilator shortages causing higher mortality among severe patients. This project aims to build a continuous positive airway pressure device.

On March 19, the MakAir open source ventilator project was started by a team of software engineers in France, using 3D printing to quickly iterate on a prototype, with the goal of letting an established manufacturer produce the final ventilators for a cost nearing €2,000. The team built a working prototype in one month, at the end of which a successful 12 hour ventilation test on a pig was performed. The project received official support from the French Army's investment branch, Agence Innovation Défense of Direction générale de l'armement, granting the project €426,000 to help fund clinical trials. Groupe SEB agreed to manufacture the MakAir ventilator in their facilities in Vernon, France. As of December 2020, the MakAir ventilator project is still active on the engineering side, with full support for both pressure and volume controlled ventilation modes, and on the medical side with ongoing clinical trials at CHU Nantes on human patients.

On March 20, 2020, Irish Health Services began reviewing the designs from the Open Source Ventilator Ireland project. A prototype is being designed and tested in Colombia.

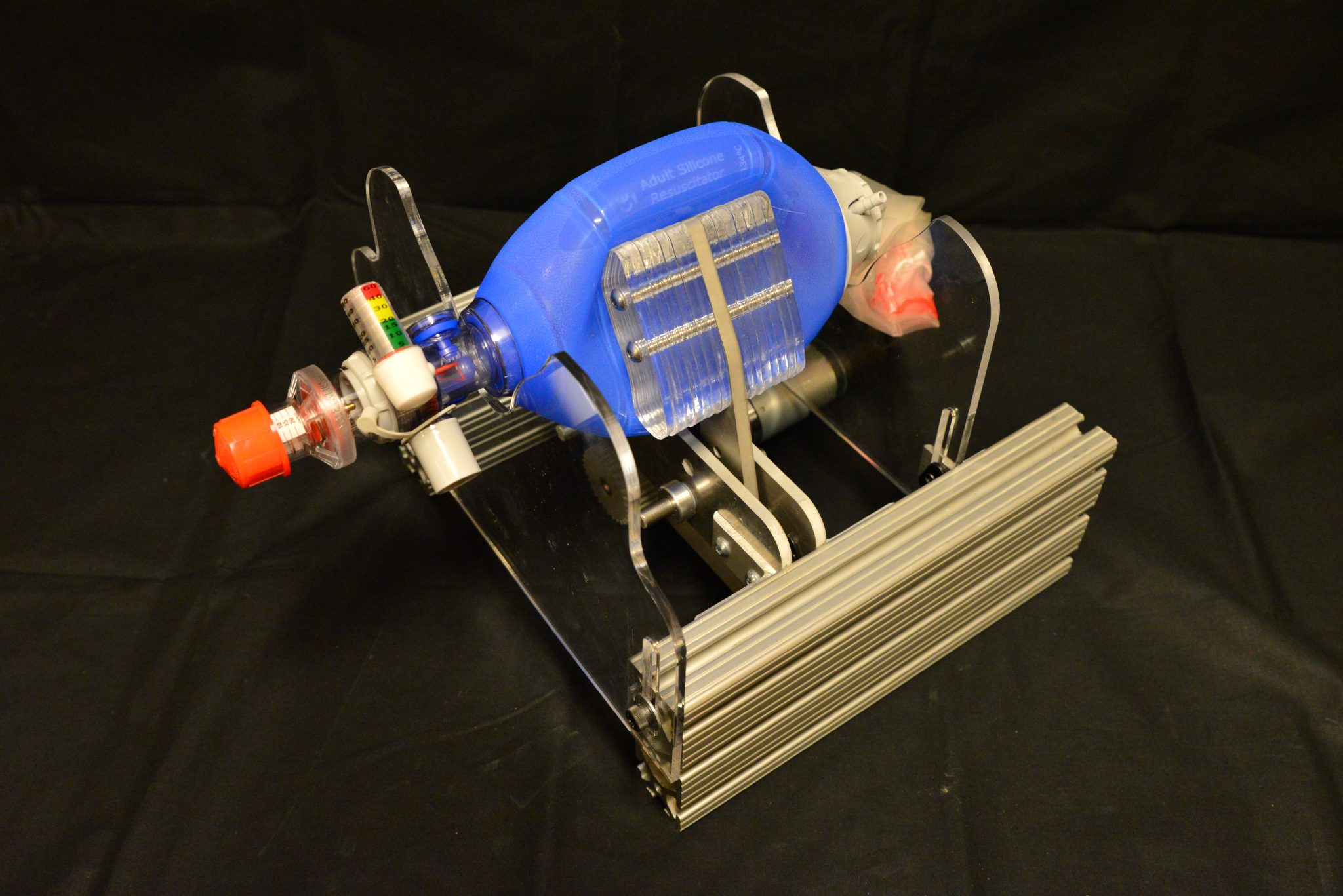
MIT E-Vent Unit 002 Setup, design by MIT

The University of Minnesota Bakken Medical Device Center initiated a collaboration with various companies to bring a ventilator alternative to the market that works as a one-armed robot and replaces the need for manual ventilation in emergency situations. The Coventor device was developed in a very short time and approved on April 15, 2020, by the FDA, only 30 days after conception. The mechanical ventilator is designed for use by trained medical professionals in intensive care units and easy to operate. It has a compact design and is relatively inexpensive to manufacture and distribute. The cost is only about 4% of a normal ventilator. In addition, this device does not require pressurized oxygen or air supply, as is normally the case. A first series is manufactured by Boston Scientific. The plans are to be freely available online to the general public without royalties.

The Polish company Urbicum reports successful testing of a 3D-printed, open source prototype device called VentilAid. The makers describe it as a last resort device when professional equipment is missing. The design is publicly available. The first Ventilaid prototype requires compressed air to run.

On March 21, 2020, the New England Complex Systems Institute (NECSI) began maintaining a strategic list of open source designs being worked on. The NECSI project considers manufacturing capability, medical safety and need for treating patients in various conditions, speed dealing with legal and political issues, logistics and supply. NECSI is staffed with scientists from Harvard, MIT, and others who have an understanding of pandemics, medicine, systems, risk, and data collection.

Massachusetts Institute of Technology began an emergency project to design a low-cost ventilator that uses a bag valve mask as the main component. Other groups and companies, such as Monolithic Power Systems, also developed designs based on this concept.

The Oxysphere project develops open blueprints for a positive pressure ventilation hood.

On April 23, 2020, NASA reported building, in 37 days, a successful COVID-19 ventilator (named VITAL ("Ventilator Intervention Technology Accessible Locally") which is currently undergoing further testing. NASA is seeking fast-track approval by the United States Food and Drug Administration for the new ventilator.

On May 29, 2020, NASA revealed the "Eight US Manufacturers Selected to Make NASA COVID-19 Ventilator."

The U.S. companies selected for licenses are:

- Vacumed, a division of Vacumetrics, Inc. in Ventura, California
- Stark Industries, LLC in Columbus, Ohio
- MVent, LLC, a division of Minnetronix Medical, in St. Paul, Minnesota
- iButtonLink, LLC in Whitewater, Wisconsin
- Evo Design, LLC in Watertown, Connecticut
- DesignPlex Biomedical, LLC in Fort Worth, Texas
- ATRON Group LLC in Dallas
- Pro-Dex, Inc. in Irvine, California

Israeli engineers created an open source ventilator

NASA VITAL Ventilator

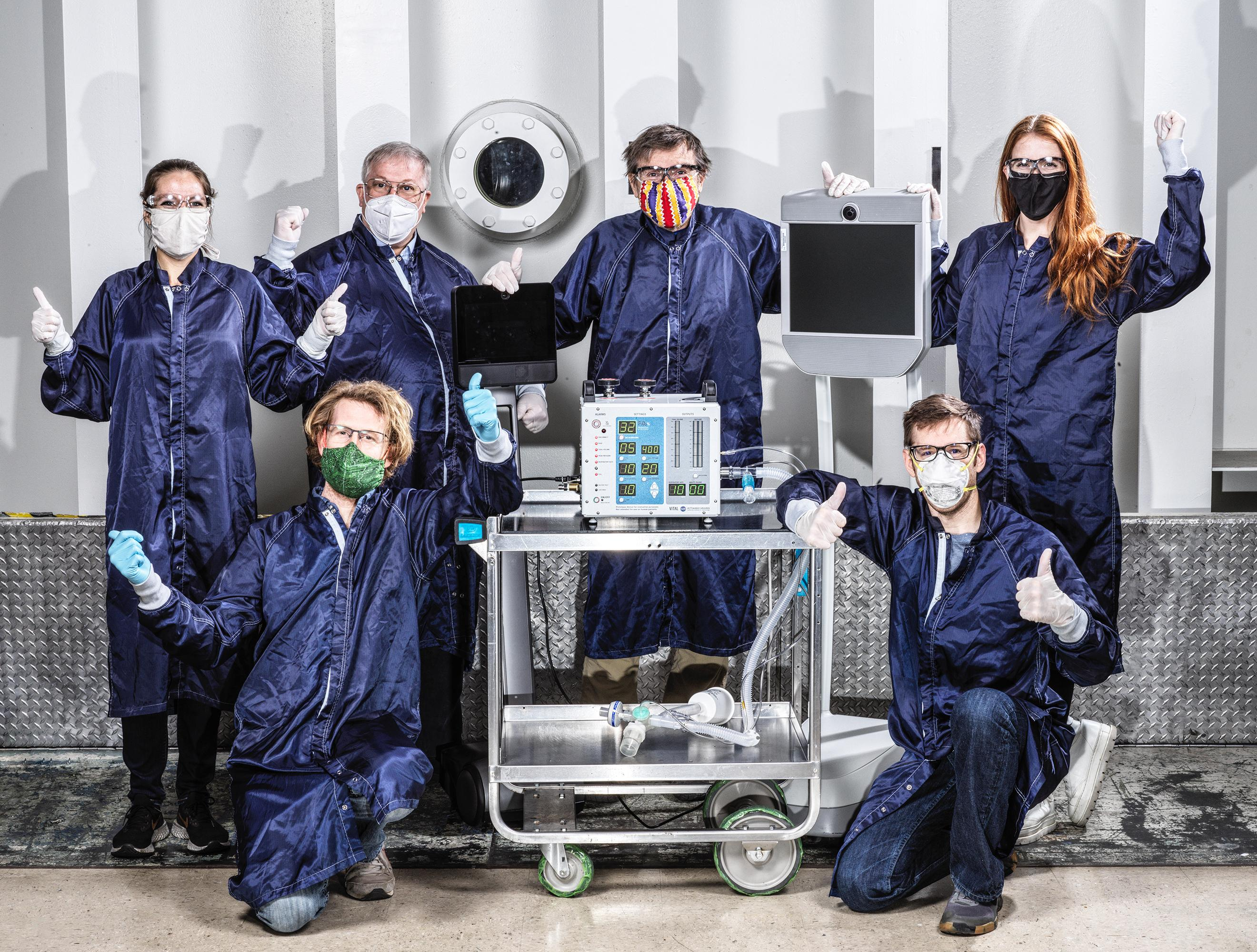
Engineering team

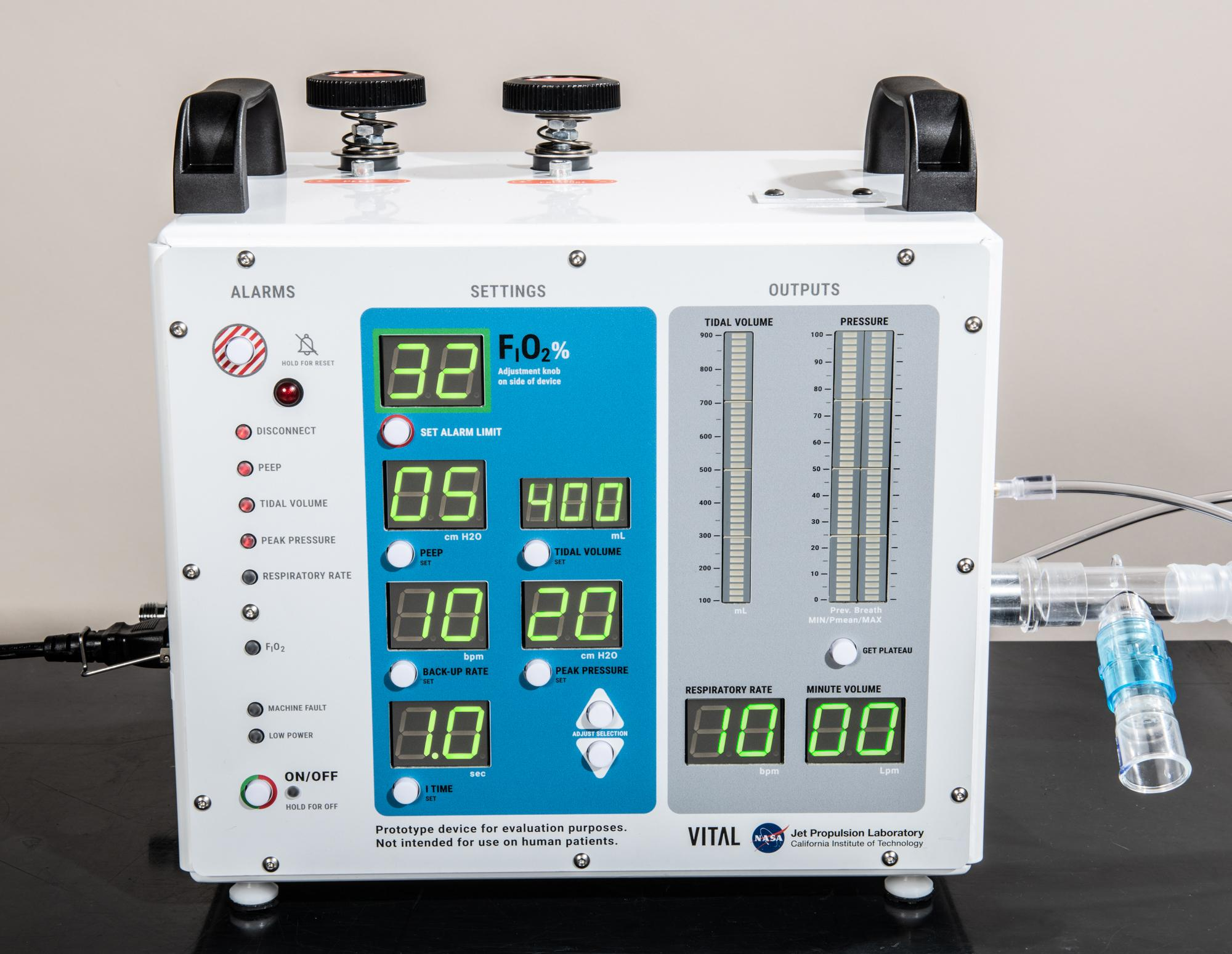
Front view

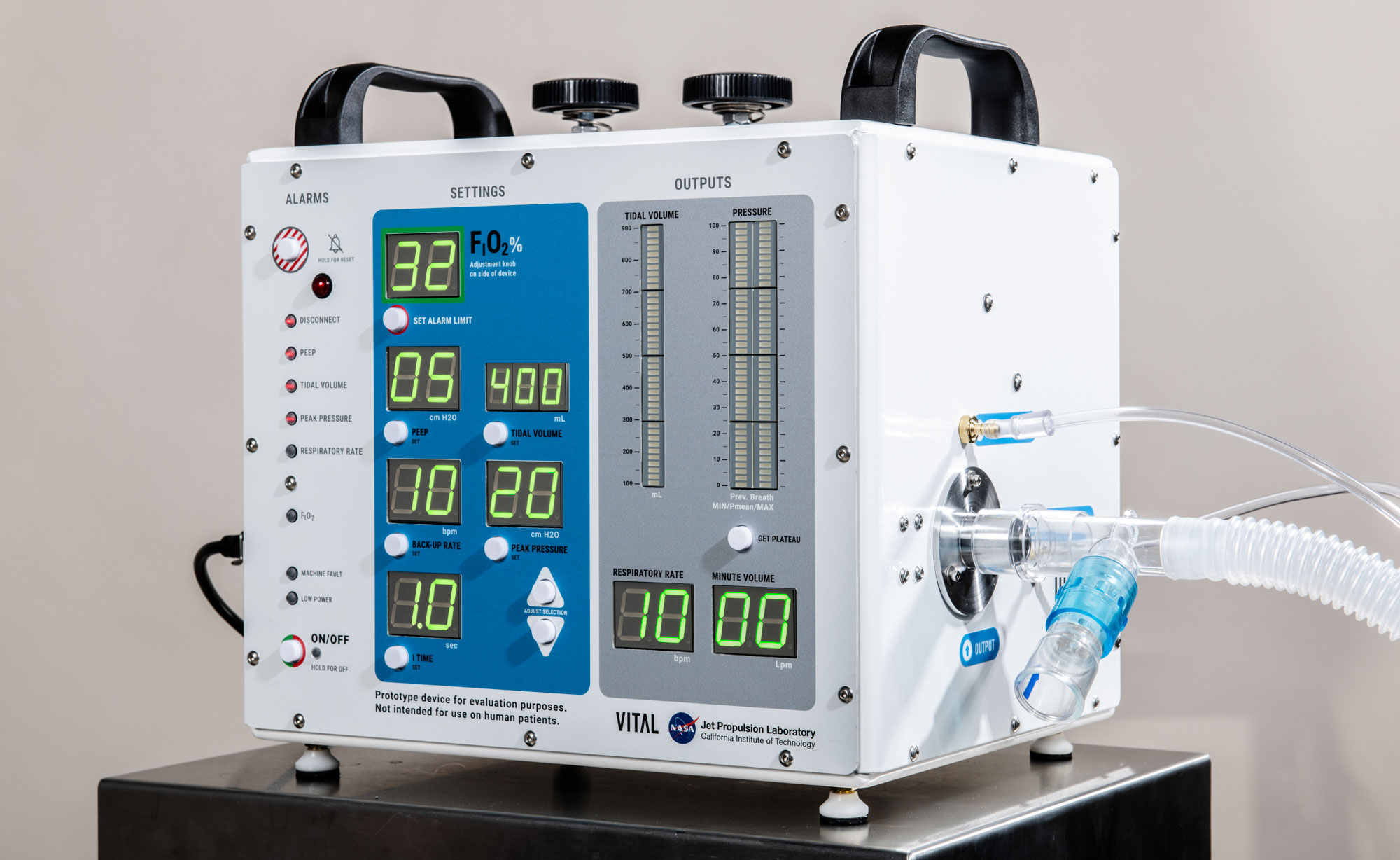
Side view

== Disaster-relief provisions ==
On March 24, 2020, the U.S. Secretary of Health and Human Services (HHS) enacted Emergency Use Authorizations to allow the use of additional devices, including: "Ventilators, positive pressure breathing devices modified for use as ventilators (collectively referred to as 'ventilators'), ventilator tubing connectors, and ventilator accessories." This was done in accordance with its February 4 declaration for medical countermeasures against COVID-19, and the equipment is subject to the FDA's "criteria for safety, performance and labeling."

== See also ==
- Shortages related to the COVID-19 pandemic § Improvised ventilators
