= Adaptive support ventilation =

Adaptive support ventilation is a method to deliver air-oxygen mixtures to patients using an electro-pneumatic device (ventilator) to assist or replace breathing in emergency care and intensive care medicine. The clinician needs to set the ventilator to meet the needs of the patient by using buttons or a touch screen. The settings are complex and include:

- the method of gas delivery (e.g. pressure controlled, flow controlled, volume controlled)
- timing information (e.g. respiratory rate, inspiratory time, expiratory time, etc.)
- sensitivity to spontaneous breathing efforts (e.g. trigger sensitivities)
- fraction of inspired oxygen
- positive end-expiratory pressure

Some methods are suitable only for completely passive patients, others only for breathing but weak patients, and others for patients with intermittent breathing activities. State of the art technology allows a rather large number of controls and adjustments which leads to a myriad of combinations, called modalities or modes of ventilation.

Adaptive support ventilation provides a simplified method of control for the medical personnel compared to other modes of respiratory support. It is applicable for all breathing insuffiencies, from complete absence of breathing capabilities to partial spontaneous breathing efforts. This does not mean that adaptive support ventilation is superior to other modalities. However, it makes the operation of the ventilator easier.

== Basic principle ==
=== Control mechanism ===
In adaptive support ventilation, the physician or respiratory therapist sets a desired minute ventilation for a given patient, the positive end-expiratory pressure) and the oxygen content of the inspired gas. The respirator provides first a few test breaths to measures the rate at which the lungs can fill and empty and then calculates the desired levels of pressure to force gas into the lungs (inhalation) and the time necessary to empty the lungs thereafter (exhalation). If the patient has no respiratory activity, adaptive support ventilation will dictate inhalation and exhalation. If the patient has some respiratory activity left, adaptive support ventilation synchronizes with the patient's breathing.

=== Safety mechanism ===
Theoretically, the minute ventilation set by the physician can be achieved with different breathing rates and tidal volumes according to the formula

MV = f x Vt

with f being the respiratory rate and Vt the volume of a breath (tidal volume). Some combinations can be harmful, though. For example, a very large breath can injure the lungs. A very small tidal volume can create ineffective breathing (like panting). In contrast to another form of controlled Minute Ventilation, Adaptive support ventilation employs three fundamental safety mechanisms:

1. provides a minimal breath volume (Vt > Vd, where Vd is the anatomical dead space)
2. forces exhalation time to be long enough to avoid breath stacking (a potentially dangerous built-up of pressure)
3. limits the inspiratory pressure to avoid lung injury

== Implementations ==
Adaptive support ventilation was first introduced by the GALILEO ventilator. The invention was claimed by different parties. The basic idea was subsequently modified to represent different mathematical models of the lung and is now available on many ventilator brands. The implementations differ from machine to machine but the underlying principle remains the same.

== See also ==
- Dual-control modes of ventilation
- Continuous mandatory ventilation
- Nomenclature of mechanical ventilation
