= Open lung ventilation =

- Specialty: Pulmonology

Within the medical field of respiratory therapy, Open lung ventilation is a strategy that is utilized by several modes of mechanical ventilation to combine low tidal volume and applied PEEP to maximize recruitment of alveoli. The low tidal volume aims to minimize alveolar overdistention and the PEEP minimizes cyclic atelectasis. Working in tandem the effects from both decrease the risk of ventilator-associated lung injury.

== Benefit ==
Some clinical trials indicate that open lung ventilation may improve mortality, other clinically important outcomes, and oxygenation.

== Dangers ==
Open lung ventilation is generally well tolerated.

== Application ==
A universally accepted protocol for open lung ventilation has not been established.
