= Mean airway pressure =

Average air pressure in assisted ventilation

Mean airway pressure typically refers to the mean pressure applied during positive-pressure mechanical ventilation. Mean airway pressure correlates with alveolar ventilation, arterial oxygenation, hemodynamic performance, and barotrauma. It can also match the alveolar pressure if there is no difference between inspiratory and expiratory resistance.

== Equations ==
There are several equations aimed at determining the real mean airway pressure.

=== Volume control ventilation ===
In ventilation with a square flow waveform this equation can be used:

$\bar{P}_{aw}=0.5\times(PIP - PEEP) \times (T_I/T_{tot})+PEEP$

where:

- $\bar{P}_{aw}$ = mean airway pressure
- $PIP$= peak inspiratory pressure
- $PEEP$= peak end expiratory pressure
- $T_I$= inspiratory time
- $T_{tot}$= cycle time

=== Pressure control ventilation ===
During pressure control ventilation this variant of the equation can be used:

$\bar{P}_{aw}= (PIP - PEEP) \times (T_I/T_{tot})+PEEP$ where:

- $\bar{P}_{aw}$ = mean airway pressure
- $PIP$= peak inspiratory pressure
- $PEEP$= peak end expiratory pressure
- $T_I$= inspiratory time
- $T_{tot}$= cycle time

=== Airway pressure release ventilation ===
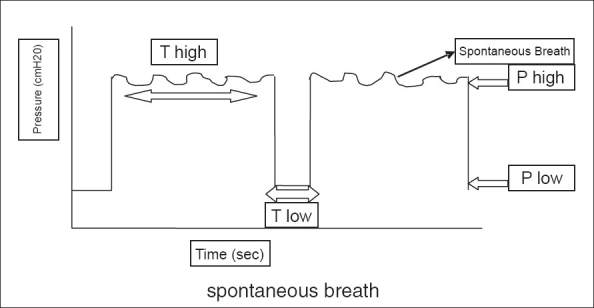
Variables of APRV schematic

In airway pressure release ventilation (APRV) a variation of the previous equation must be used for the variables:

$$\bar{P}_{aw} = \frac{(P_{high} \times T_{high})\, + (P_{low} \times T_{low})} {T_{high} + T_{low}}$$
where:
- $\bar{P}_{aw}$= mean airway pressure
- ${P}_{high}$= peak inspiratory pressure (PIP)
- ${P}_{low}$= peak end expiratory pressure
- ${T}_{high}$= time spent at ${P}_{high}$
- ${T}_{low}$= time spent at ${P}_{low}$

=== Other equations ===
$$M_{PAW} = \frac{f \times T_i}{60} \times (P_{IP} - PEEP) + PEEP$$

$$M_{PAW} = \frac{F_1}{F_1+F_E} \times P_{IP} + \left(1 - \frac{F_1}{F_1+F_E}\right) \times PEEP$$

$$M_{PAW} = \frac{(R)(T_i)(P_I)+[60-(R)(T_i)](PEEP)}{60}$$

$M_{PAW} = \frac{f \times T_i}{60} \times (P_{IP} - PEEP) + PEEP$

$$M_{PAW} = \frac{(T_i \times P_{IP}) + (T_e \times PEEP)}{T_i+T_e}$$

== Clinical significance ==
Mean airway pressure has been shown to have a similar correlation as plateau pressure to mortality.

MAP is closely associated with mean alveolar pressure and shows the stresses exerted on the lung parenchyma on mechanical ventilation.

In high frequency oscillatory ventilation, it has been suggested to set the mean airway pressure six above the lower inflection point on the lungs P-V curve.

== See also ==
- Ventilators
- Mechanical ventilation
- Modes of ventilation
- Mean systemic pressure
