= Airway pressure release ventilation =

Pressure control mode of mechanical ventilation

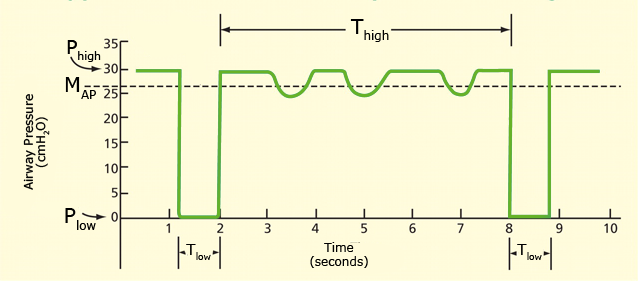
A pressure-time graphic

Airway pressure release ventilation (APRV) is a pressure control mode of mechanical ventilation that utilizes an inverse ratio ventilation strategy. APRV is an applied continuous positive airway pressure (CPAP) that at a set timed interval releases the applied pressure. Depending on the ventilator manufacturer, it may be referred to as BiVent. This is just as appropriate to use, since the only difference is that the term APRV is copyrighted.

== History ==
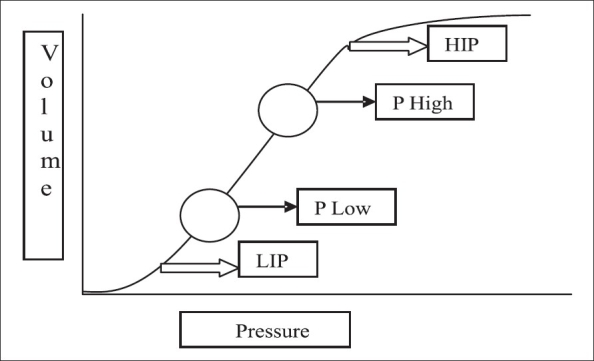
Static pressure-volume curve during volume-controlled mechanical ventilation. High pressure ('P high') is set below the high inflection point (HIP) and low pressure is set above the low inflection point (LIP).

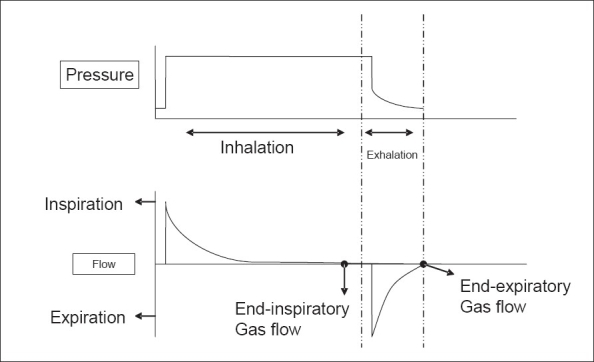
Corresponding pressure and flow curves during one cycle of inflationdeflation. Notice the flow curve goes back to zero at the end of inflation, indicating full lung inflation; and also goes back to zero during the release period before inflation starts, indicating complete gas exhalation with no intrinsic PEEP.

Airway pressure release ventilation was described initially by Stock and Downs in 1987 as a continuous positive airway pressure (CPAP) with an intermittent release phase. APRV begins at a pressure higher than the baseline pressure and follows with a deflation to accomplish tidal ventilation. Fundamentally APRV is a time-cycled alternant between two levels of positive airway pressure, with the main time on the high level and a brief expiratory release to facilitate ventilation.

== Indications ==
Based on clinical and experimental data, airway pressure release ventilation is indicated in patients with acute lung injury, acute respiratory distress syndrome and atelectasis after major surgery

== Inverse ratio ventilation ==
This is a type of inverse ratio ventilation. The exhalation time (T_{low}) is shortened to usually less than one second to maintain alveoli inflation. Fundamentally this is a continuous pressure with a brief release. APRV is currently the most efficient, conventional mode for lung protective ventilation.

== Settings and measurements ==
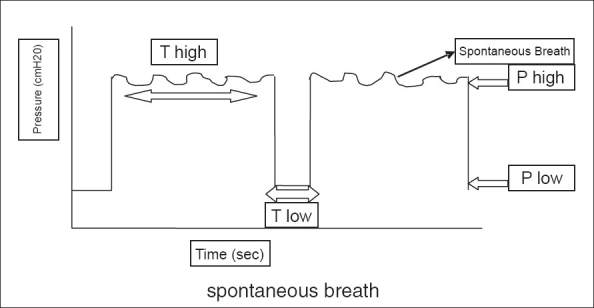
Pressure-time curve for APRV. 'P high' is the high CPAP, 'P low' is the low CPAP, 'T high' is the duration of 'P high,' and 'T low' is the release period or the duration of 'P low.' Spontaneous breathing appears on the top of 'P high.'

Settings are sometimes brand specific and the term for the individual settings may differ, however generally the settings listed here are a fundamental explanation of the purpose of the settings within the APRV mode.

- P_{high} — This is the inspiratory pressure (just like in pressure control).
- T_{high} — This value is the number of seconds during the inhalation phase.
- T_{peep} — Also known as the T_{low}, this is the time allotted for expiration.
- FiO_{2} — The fractional O2 percentage of the delivered air-and-oxygen mixture.

=== Mean airway pressure ===
Mean airway pressure on APRV is calculated by this formula:

$$\frac{(P_{high} * T_{high})\, + (P_{low} * T_{low})} {T_{high} + T_{low}}$$

== Perceptions and receptions ==
Different perceptions of this mode may exist around the globe. While 'APRV' is common to users in North America, a very similar mode, biphasic positive airway pressure (BIPAP), was introduced in Europe. The term APRV has also been used in American journals where, from the ventilation characteristics, BIPAP would have been the appropriate terminology. To further confusion, BiPAP is a registered trade-mark for a noninvasive ventilation mode in a specific ventilator (Respironics Inc.). Other names (BILEVEL, DUOPAP, BIVENT) have been created for legal reasons. Although similar in modality, these terms describe how a mode is intended to inflate the lung, rather than defining the characteristics of synchronization or the way spontaneous breathing efforts are supported. Concern has been raised about the amount of mechanical power applied to the lung during APRV and the risk of ergotrauma, especially in pulmonary ARDS.

== Other terms ==
APRV is used by many brands and models of mechanical ventilators under different names. Most names are copyrighted as trademarks and do not represent nomenclature of mechanical ventilation but may be referred to clinically by the brand name.

Some of these names include:

- BiVent - (Servo-i ventilator by Maquet)
- BiLevel - (Puritan Bennett 840 ventilator by Covidien, Flight-60 ventilator by Flight Medical)
- DuoPAP - ( C-1 ventilator by Hamilton)
