= Table of modes of mechanical ventilation =

Modes of mechanical ventilation refers to the methods a Ventilator offers to assist or replace spontaneous breathing. Modern Ventilators provide a number of such Modes (derived from Modus operandi) to enable the most suitable respiratory support for the individual patient. Each Mode has its particular set of Controls to adapt the breath delivery to the patient. CAVEAT: Although manufacturers may offer identical breath delivery methods, the names of the Modes may be different.

== Overview ==
Schematic overview of cascaded modes of mechanical ventilation, showing Basic Modes, a first cascade layer (Dual Control Modes) to control the basic modes, and a second cascade layer (Adaptive Modes) to set targets for the Dual Control Modes.

Commercially available ventilators offer different Modes of breath delivery, each with its particular set of control knobs. Breath delivery methods and terminology are not standardized and can thus be quite confusing. However, by and large, they can be grouped into Basic Modes, Dual Control Modes and Adaptive Modes. Three tables are provided below to illustrate these three groups.

NOTE: not all controls on a ventilator are part of a Mode, for example alarm settings and monitoring values are used independent of the Mode. Also, the control to set the percentage oxygen (fraction of inspired oxygen, FiO2) is not part of a Mode.

== Basic Modes ==
In the basic breath delivery Modes, the ventilator acts as a high-fidelity delivery device. The clinician's settings are direct commands to the inspiratory and expiratory valve controls. The ventilator uses fast sensors for intra-breath control to match the clinicians settings exactly. Breath delivery follows the phases of breathing, i.e., inhalation and exhalation. Each Mode defines how breath delivery and timing can be controlled by the clinician.

=== Definition of terms ===
==== Start of inhalation (Trigger) ====
The start of inhalation is initiated either by the machine or the patient and that point in time is called Inspiratory Trigger. The ventilator needs to know when to start delivering gas to the patient. If the patient does not breathe at all, a timer starts inhalation. If the patient has some breathing activity, the ventilator can sense this effort by measuring pressure or flow and start inhalation if pressure or flow drop below a certain threshold. That threshold is called Trigger Sensitivity. Thus, the controls available to the clinician are respiratory rate and trigger sensitivity.

NOTE: Trigger sensitivity plays a double role. Evidently, it determines the start of inhalation and, by the same token, it ends expiration. For example, if trigger sensitiviy is set too sensive, it may influence respiratory rate and create tachypnea.

==== Inhalation and breath delivery ====
Once the ventilators is triggered to deliver respiratory gas, two methods to deliver the gas mixture are technically possible: flow controlled or pressure controlled gas gelivery. Both methods have their advantages and disadvantages. If flow controlled gas delivery is chosen, it is often combined with a Volume limit which stops gas delivery when a set volume is reached. Thus, the term Volume Controlled Ventilation is often used. The controls available to the clinician are inspiratory pressure, inspiratory flow and/or inspiratory volume.

==== Start of exhalation (Cycling) ====
Inhalation must eventually stop and cycle to exhalation to enable the lungs to exhale. If the patient does not breathe, the ventilator must switch to exhalation after a pre-set time (time cycled) has elapsed, a certain pressure is exceeded (pressure cycled) or a pre-set volume (volume cycled) has been delivered. If the patient has some breathing activity, the ventilator can sense this by measuring flow and start exhalation, for example, if flow drops below a certain threshold. That threshold may be termed "Expiratory Trigger Sensitivity". The controls available to the clinician are inspiratory time, inspiratory volume, inspiratory flow, maximum pressure and/or expiratory trigger sensitivity.

NOTE: Inspiratory flow can be expressed as V'I = Vt/Ti and respiratory rate f = 60/(Ti+Te). Both formulas have three variables and two degrees of freedom. This means that only two variables can be controlled independently, the third variable follows.

==== Exhalation ====
Emtpying the lungs requires time which starts with the onset of exhalation and ends with the start of the subsequent inhalation. If the patient is passive, the exhalation is terminated by a timer. If the patient has some breathing activity, exhalation may be terminated by the subsequent inhalation effort of the patient. Controls include a selection of expiratory time, respiratory rate and/or trigger sensitivity.

NOTE: The pressure maintained throughout exhalation is termed Positive End-Expiratory Pressure PEEP. CPAP differs from PEEP because the patient can inhale and exhale in CPAP.

=== Table of Basic Modes and their acronyms ===
The table below lists the working principles of some of the common Modes of ventilation.

- Breath delivery mechanism: Flow means that the ventilator controls the valve to maintain a set flow independent of pressure or volume. Pressure means that the ventilator maintains a set pressure, independent of flow and volume.
- Trigger: start of inhalation
- Cycling: start of exhalation
- Vent means controlled by ventilator based on settings by clinician.
- Pat means controlled by patient, based on measurements of flow, pressure or muscle activity.

Mode examples, not exhaustive!	Trigger	Breath Delivery Mechanism	Cycling	Remark
Volume Controlled Ventilation, VC CMV, VCV, A/C	Vent or Pat	Flow	Vent	Clinicians sets tidal volume, flow waveform and timing. Ventilator adjusts the valves to deliver that exact volume irrespective of changing resistance and compliance of the patient.
Pressure Controlled Ventilation PC	Vent or Pat	Pressure	Vent	Clinician sets a pressure trajectory (inspiratory pressure level and inspiratory time). Ventilator uses a pressure transducer to servo-control the valve, creating the desired pressure wave (usually a square wave) at the airway opening.
Synchronized Intermittent Mandatory Ventilation SIMV (volume cycled)	Vent or Pat	Flow (mandatory breath) or Pressure (spontaneous breath)	Vent or Pat	Combination of VC and PS. Basis is Volume Controlled Ventilation. Patient can take breaths in between.
Synchronized Intermittent Mandatory Ventilation SIMV (pressure limited)	Vent or Pat	Pressure	Vent or Pat	Combination of PC and PS. Basis is Volume Controlled Ventilation. Patient can take breaths in between.
Continuous Positive Airway Pressure CPAP	Pat	Pressure	Pat	Ventilator maintains a set pressure (PEEP) independent of patient effort.
Pressure Support PS	Pat	Pressure	Pat	Clinician sets a pressure level. The control loop is identical to PCV for maintaining pressure, but breath cycling is determined by patient flow decay. The level of support is fixed until changed by the clinician.
Airway Pressure Release Ventilation, APRV, Bilevel Positive Airway Pressure, BiPAP, DuoPAP	Vent or Pat	Pressure	Vent or Pat	Clinician sets two levels of pressure and the time to switch between the two. Ventilator maintains each level independent of patient effort. Patient can breathe on both levels.
Proportional Assist Ventilation PAV	Pat	Pressure	Pat	Advanced basic mode. Clinician sets a fixed degree of support (assist %) rather than a pressure level. Pressure level is calculated by ventilator as a proportion of delivered volume and flow.
Neurally Adjusted Ventilation Assist NAVA	Pat	Pressure	Pat	The diaphragm's electrical activity (EAdi) is the commanding waveform; the ventilator delivers pressure in proportion to the EAdi signal with a fixed gain set by the clinician.

PAV and NAVA were designed to provide superior synchrony with the patient's breathing by using a physiological signal as the command source.

== Dual Control Modes ==
Dual Control Modes introduce an outer control loop that wraps around a Basic Mode. The clinician sets a performance target (for example Vt and respiratory rate) and the ventilator then uses a Basic Mode (usually a pressure-controlled or pressure-support breath) as its actuator and automatically adjusts the pressure level from breath to breath to meet the performance target.

This represents a significant user-interface advantage. The clinician can manage the fundamental goals of ventilation—for example tidal volume or respiratory rate —while the machine handles the technical translation into the required pressure, adapting automatically to changes in the patient's respiratory system compliance and resistance and spontaneous activity.

=== Table of Dual Control Modes and their acronyms ===
The table below lists the working principles of some of the Dual Control Modes. The clinician set a desired target, for example the tidal volume Vt and the ventilator adjusts one of the variables of provided by the basic mode it uses.

- The Target Variable is set by the clinician and fixed.
- The Controlled Variable is adjusted by the ventilator to achieve the Target Value.

Mode examples, not exhaustive!	Underlying Basic Mode	Target Variable	Controlled Variable	Remark
Pressure-Regulated Volume Control PRVC, VC+, AutoFlow	Pressure Controlled	Tidal volume	Inspiratory pressure	Ventilator operates in a Pressure Control (Basic Mode) scheme. After each mandatory breath, it compares the delivered Vt to the clinician-set target Vt. It then adjusts the inspiratory pressure level for the next mandatory breath upward or downward.
Volume Support VS	Pressure Supported	Tidal volume	Pressure support level	This is the Targeted Spontaneous Mode counterpart to PRVC. It uses Pressure Support (Basic Mode) as its actuator. After each spontaneous breath, ventilator adjusts the PS level for the subsequent breath to achieve the set Vt target.
Mandatory Rate Ventilation MRV	Pressure Supported	Respiratory Rate	Pressure support level	This is the Respiratory Rate counterpart to VS. Uses Pressure Support (Basic Mode) as its actuator. After each spontaneous breath, ventilator adjusts the PS level for the subsequent breath to achieve the set Respiratory Rate target.
Mandatory Minute Ventilation MMV	Pressure Supported	Minute Ventilation	Number of Mandatory Breaths	Ventilator provides a spontaneous Mode with or without inspiratory support set by the clinician. Clinician also sets desired Minute Ventilation MVtarget. The ventilator monitors Minute Ventilation taken by the patient (MVpat). If MVpat drops below MVtarget, ventilator provides a VC breath to the patient with volume and timing as preset by the clinican.
Volume Assured Pressure Support Ventilation VAPSV	Pressure Control and Volume Control	Tidal Volume	Pressure support level plus volume add	This Mode represents intra-breath target enforcement. Ventilator primarily delivers Pressure Support (Basic Mode). Within the ongoing inspiratory phase, if the algorithm predicts that the decaying flow of the PS breath will not meet the set Vt target, ventilator automatically switches the control logic to a Volume Control (Basic Mode) waveform for the remainder of that breath to guarantee the volume. This is sophisticated targeting, but the goal remains achieving the clinician's predefined Vt.
Automode	Selectable Mode 1 and Mode 2	Switching criterium	Mode 1 or Mode 2	This is a Mode-manager that operates on top of dual control modes. It pairs two Dual Control Modes (e.g., PRVC and VS) and ventilator automatically switches between them based on the presence or absence of patient triggering, all while maintaining the clinician-set volume targets.

== Adaptive Modes ==
Adaptive Modes employ a supervisory control layer that automates the treatment strategy. The clinician inputs a high-level goal (typically Minute Ventilation or blood gas values), and the ventilator assumes responsibility for setting the intermediate performance targets (like Vt and RR plus PEEP and FiO2) and adjusting them over time based on measurements of the patient's pathology (airways resistance, lung elastance, spontaneous breathing, gas exchange).

=== Adaptive Support Ventilation (ASV) and Adaptive Ventilation Mode (AVM) ===
The mechanism of these Modes is called cascaded adaptive control. In ASV, the clinician inputs the patient's ideal body weight and a percent minute ventilation (%MinVol). The clinician does not set a specific Vt or RR, this is done by the ventilator algorithm as follows. The ventilator continuously measures the expiratory time constant (a product of compliance and resistance). Using the "minimum work of breathing" mathematical model, it autonomously calculates and sets the optimal combination of Respiratory Rate RR and tidal volume Vt for the measured mechanics. It then uses its internal SIMV algorithm (a Targeted Mode) to deliver breaths meeting these self-determined targets. AVM follows the same principle with different target optimisation.

=== INTELLiVENT-ASV ===
The mechanism of this mode extends ASV by adding integrated closed-loops for both ventilation (adjusting the %MinVol target based on end-tidal CO₂) and oxygenation (adjusting PEEP and FiO₂ based on SpO₂). It represents full, multi-parameter adaptation to the patient's gas exchange and mechanical pathology.

=== SmartCare/PS ===
The mechanism of this Mode was developed using an expert systems approach. SmartCare/PS can be viewed as a supervisory weaning system. The clinician sets criteria for a stable, wean-ready pattern (e.g., Vt, RR ranges). The system monitors the patient over a window of time (hours). If the patient remains within the "stable zone," it automatically reduces the PS level; if the patient struggles, it increases support. It adapts a heuristic weaning strategy to the patient's resolving respiratory pathology to reduce ventilatory support automatically.

== See also ==
- Respiratory therapy
