= Plateau pressure =

Plateau pressure (P_{PLAT}) is the pressure applied to small airways and alveoli during positive-pressure mechanical ventilation. It is measured during an inspiratory pause on the mechanical ventilator. In ARDS maintain plateau pressure <30cm of water measured on ventilator.
