= Pressure support ventilation =

Medical intervention

Pressure support ventilation (PSV), also known as pressure support, is a spontaneous mode of ventilation. The patient initiates every breath and the ventilator delivers support with the preset pressure value. With support from the ventilator, the patient also regulates their own respiratory rate and tidal volume.

In Pressure Support, the set inspiratory pressure support level is kept constant and there is a decelerating flow. The patient triggers all breaths. If there is a change in the mechanical properties of the lung/thorax and patient effort, the delivered tidal volume will be affected. The user must then regulate the pressure support level to obtain desired ventilation.

== Oxygenation ==
Pressure support improves oxygenation, ventilation and decreases work of breathing.

== Ventilation ==
Pressure support improves patient ventilation.

== Work of breathing ==
Pressure support decreases overall work of breathing when used in tandem with an intermittent mechanical ventilation mode.
