= Association of Shelter Veterinarians =

American professional organization

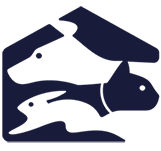
- Abbreviation: ASV
- Formation: 2001
- Founded at: American Humane Association Conference, Washington, D.C.
- Legal status: 501(c)3
- Headquarters: Apex, North Carolina
- Fields: Shelter medicine
- Members: 700 licensed veterinarians (2014)
- President: Staci Kehir, DVM
- Main organ: Board of Directors
- Publication: Journal of Shelter Medicine and Community Animal Health
- Affiliations: World Small Animal Veterinary Association, 2024
- Revenue: US$251,561 (2022)
- Expenses: US$192,824 (2022)
- Staff: 14 (2022)
- Volunteers: 25 (2022)
- Website: www.sheltervet.org

The Association of Shelter Veterinarians (ASV) is an American national professional association for veterinarians in the shelter medicine specialty. Founded in 2001 as the first professional organization for shelter medicine, the ASV successfully advocated for the establishment of shelter medicine board certification, accreditation programs and expansion of shelter medicine curricula. The ASV continues to publish guidelines for shelter medicine practice, advocate for the shelter medicine field, and publish its journal, the Journal of Shelter Medicine and Community Animal Health.

== History ==
The Association of Shelter Veterinarians was founded in 2001 at the American Humane Association Conference in Washington, D.C..

In 2012, the ASV petitioned the American Veterinary Medical Association's American Board of Veterinary Specialties (ABVS) for shelter medicine's recognition as a veterinary specialty. The specialty was provisionally recognized in 2014. In March 2023, following another petition from the ASV in 2022, shelter medicine was fully recognized as a veterinary specialty.

== Activities ==
The ASV has promulgated two editions of The Guidelines for Standards of Care in Animal Shelters: the first edition in December 2010, and the second edition in January 2023. The Guidelines were created as a framework for management of American animal shelters, given the lack of a national oversight body for their operation. The foundation of the Guidelines is in the Five Freedoms model. As of 2013, the Guidelines have been endorsed by the National Federation of Humane Societies, the Society of Animal Welfare Administrators, the National Animal Control Association, the American Society for the Prevention of Cruelty to Animals, and the Humane Society of the United States.

The ASV also created the Veterinary Medical Care Guidelines for Spay-Neuter Programs to provide guidance to spay-neuter projects. The first edition was published in JAVMA in 2008; the second edition in 2016 added guidance for animal hospitals.

The ASV recognizes outstanding shelter medicine practitioners with the Veterinarian of the Year award.

=== Journal of Shelter Medicine and Community Animal Health ===
The Journal of Shelter Medicine and Community Animal Health (JSMCAH, officially pronounced "jazz-macaw") is the independent online journal of the ASV. The journal was first published in December 2022. The journal focuses on shelter medicine and veterinary community medicine.

== See also ==
- Veterinary medicine in the United States
- One Health
- Humane society
- Animal rescue group
