= Prone ventilation =

Method of ventilation in which the patient lies face-down

Prone ventilation, sometimes called prone positioning or proning, is a method of mechanical ventilation with the patient lying face-down (prone). It improves oxygenation in most patients with acute respiratory distress syndrome (ARDS) and reduces mortality. The earliest trial investigating the benefits of prone ventilation occurred in 1976. Since that time, many meta-analyses and one randomized control trial, the PROSEVA trial, have shown an increase in patients' survival with the more severe versions of ARDS. There are many proposed mechanisms, but they are not fully delineated. The proposed utility of prone ventilation is that this position will improve lung mechanics, improve oxygenation, and increase survival. Although improved oxygenation has been shown in multiple studies, this position change's survival benefit is not as clear. Similar to the slow adoption of low tidal volume ventilation utilized in ARDS, many believe that the investigation into the benefits of prone ventilation will likely be ongoing in the future.

== Physiologic effects ==
The purpose of prone ventilation is to better facilitate lung mechanics to improve ventilation/perfusion ratio mismatches in ARDS.

By redistributing pulmonary blood flow, oxygen levels can increase from low ventilated areas to higher ventilation. The physiologic mechanism can be explained by a gravity-dependent increase in pleural pressure when supine compared to prone. In the prone position, the lungs' dorsal aspects have less pleural pressure, which alleviates forces trying to collapse the alveoli. When there is less pleural pressure, the alveoli can stay open and thus increase surface area for ventilation. Because there are more alveoli dorsally than ventrally, a prone position allows for more dorsal alveoli to stay open and thus increase the amount of ventilation available to be perfused. Another benefit of prone ventilation may come from reduced VALI (Ventilator-associated lung injury). Proning and the redistribution of dependent fluid lead to more homogenous compliance of the lung and thus minimizes the barotrauma that usually occurs from more heterogeneous lungs and the repeated opening and closing of alveoli associated with it produces. An observational study in 2007 found a reduction in IL-6, a marker of systemic inflammation, in the prone ventilation group compared to the supine ventilation. This reduction in inflammation was attributed to a decrease in barotrauma and a rapid decrease in the need for high FiO_{2}, reducing the number of reactive oxygen species contributing to ongoing inflammation in the lung.

== Clinical applications ==
The studies that have found survival benefit of prone ventilation derived benefit only from patients with severe ARDS defined as a Horowitz index of less than 200–150 mm Hg. A meta-analysis published in 2017 suggested that patients only benefit from prone ventilation when they are in a prone position for longer than 12 hours a day. A trained staff and the resources to move/monitor patients is important

== COVID-19 pandemic ==
During the 2020 COVID-19 pandemic, awake high flow nasal cannula in the prone position, awake proning, was utilized to keep patients from being intubated. A retrospective analysis showed that the number needed to treat and keep people off the ventilator was 6. This significantly reduced amount of required ventilators allowing for the use of ventilators in those in critical condition. The Society of Critical Care Medicine gave prone ventilation a weak recommendation in The Surviving Sepsis Campaign COVID-19 panel. The panel cited the few studies that showed morality benefit from prone ventilation in ARDS and that this was a low-cost intervention; however, they cautioned the use due to the necessity of needing competent staff and complications that can occur if done incorrectly.

== Considerations in the pediatric population ==
Special precautions must be in place for prone ventilation in children because of their risk of sudden infant death syndrome (SIDS). An updated Cochrane meta-analysis (2022) found low certainty evidence of benefit in oxygen saturation with prone positioning of mechanically ventilated preterm infants with ARDS but due to the increased risk of SIDS hospitalized infants and children should only be placed in this position with cardiorespiratory monitoring.

== Contraindications ==
1. Hemodynamic instability.
2. unstable fractures or polytrauma patients with unstable fracture spine
3. tracheostomy
4. chest tubes
5. obesity
6. pregnancy
7. intracranial pressure raised
8. cardiac surgery
9. massive hemoptysis
10. aspiration pneumonia

== Complications ==
There are many complications of proning patients. Most of the complications occur because of the intrinsic position and the effect of gravity on body parts unaccustomed to its effects. Some complications have occurred because of the logistics of increased time that staff members need to monitor and help patients in this disabling position. Complications include increased endotracheal tube displacement and even accidental extubation, loss of vascular lines, pressure sores, brachial plexopathy, enteral feeding intolerance, facial edema, and injury. New data from patients with COVID-19 found that prone ventilation was associated with a deterioration in glycaemic control and increased insulin requirements, although the mechanism of this remains obscure.
