= Pressure control =

Mode of mechanical ventilation

Pressure control (PC) is a mode of mechanical ventilation alone and a variable within other modes of mechanical ventilation. Pressure control is used to regulate pressures applied during mechanical ventilation. Air delivered into the patients lungs (breaths) are currently regulated by Volume Control or Pressure Control. In pressure controlled breaths a tidal volume achieved is based on how much volume can be delivered before the pressure control limit is reached.

== Uses ==
Pressure control is used in any situation where pulmonary barotrauma may occur such as acute respiratory distress syndrome.

== Characteristics ==
- Type of breath — Only mandatory breaths are available to the patient in the pressure control mode in CMV. In PC-IMV the patient may breathe spontaneously but will get a pressure supported breath with PEEP rather than a mandatory breath.
- Triggering mechanism — The mandatory breaths in the pressure control mode are time triggered by a preset rate.
- Cycling mechanism — The mandatory breaths are time cycled by a preset inspiratory time.
