= Flow waveform =

The Flow waveform for the human respiratory system in lung ventilators, is the shape of air flow that is blown into the patient's airways. Computer technology allows the practitioner to select particular flow patterns, along with volume and pressure settings, in order to achieve the best patient outcomes and reduce complications experienced while on a mechanical ventilator.

== Description ==
Modern lung ventilators are able to generate three basic wave forms of flow: squared waveform, descending waveform, and sinusoidal waveform. A square waveform pattern is found on most mechanical ventilators, old and new, and achieves a constant flow.

During the inspiration phase, the flow rate rises to a predetermined level and remains constant, thus giving the appearance of a square wave form. This produces the shortest inspiratory time compared to other flow patterns. A decelerating flow waveform pattern, also known as descending ramp, achieves the highest level of flow at the start of a breath, when patient flow demand is often greatest.

== See also ==
- Artificial ventilation
- Respiratory therapy
