= Continuous spontaneous ventilation =

Mode of mechanical ventilation

Continuous spontaneous ventilation is any mode of mechanical ventilation where every breath is spontaneous (i.e., patient triggered and patient cycled).

Spontaneous breathing is defined as the movement of gas in and out of the lungs that is produced in response to an individual's respiratory muscles. In a nutshell, spontaneous breathing is natural breathing. While at rest, a typical adult will take an average of 18 breaths per minute. Most people are unaware of their breathing patterns unless something interferes with the efficiency of this process. In extreme cases, mechanical ventilation is used when spontaneous breathing is inadequate or ceases entirely.

== Dependent modes ==
Some modes of mechanical ventilation require spontaneous ventilation, some of these include:

- Bilevel positive airway pressure (BPAP, BiPAP®)
- Continuous positive airway pressure (CPAP)
- Airway pressure release ventilation (APRV, (BiVent®)
