= Peak inspiratory pressure =

In mechanical ventilation

Peak inspiratory pressure (P_{IP}) is the highest level of pressure applied to the lungs during inhalation. In mechanical ventilation the number reflects a positive pressure in centimeters of water pressure (cm H_{2}O). In normal breathing, it may sometimes be referred to as the maximal inspiratory pressure (M_{IPO}), which is a negative value.

Peak inspiratory pressure increases with any airway resistance. Factors that may increase P_{IP} include increased secretions, bronchospasm, biting down on ventilation tubing, and decreased lung compliance. P_{IP} should never be chronically higher than 40 cm H_{2}O unless the patient has acute respiratory distress syndrome.

== See also ==
- Static compliance
- Dynamic compliance
