= Intermittent mandatory ventilation =

Intermittent Mandatory Ventilation (IMV) is any mode of mechanical ventilation where a regular series of breaths is scheduled, but the ventilator senses patient effort and reschedules mandatory breaths based on the calculated need of the patient. Similar to continuous mandatory ventilation in parameters set for the patient's pressures and volumes, but distinct in its ability to support a patient by either supporting their effort or providing support when patient effort is not sensed. IMV is frequently paired with additional strategies to improve weaning from ventilator support or to improve cardiovascular stability in patients who may need full life support.

To help illustrate the use of the different types of ventilation, it is helpful to think of a continuum of the common ventilator settings: assist control or continuous mechanical ventilation (AC/CMV), to SIMV, to pressure support (PS). The lungs require a certain amount of oxygen to fill them, the volume, and a certain amount of force to get the oxygen into the lungs, the pressure. In assist control, one of those variables will be controlled by the ventilator, either pressure or volume. Typically, in AC/CMV, it is volume.

In AC/CMV, the ventilator delivers a set volume whenever the patient triggers a breath. In contrast, pressure support delivers a set pressure for every triggered breath, rather than a set volume. SIMV works between AC and PS; it will deliver a set volume only when the patient reaches the breath threshold, instead of just triggering a breath. If the patient does not reach the threshold, then no volume will be delivered, and the patient will be responsible for whatever volume they get into their lungs.

== Synchronized intermittent mechanical ventilation (SIMV) ==
Synchronized Intermittent Mechanical Ventilation is a variation of IMV, in which the ventilator breaths are synchronized with the patient's inspiratory effort. SIMV, with and without pressure support, has not been shown to have any advantages over continuous mandatory ventilation (CMV) in terms of mortality or weaning success, and has been shown to result in longer weaning times when compared to t-piece trials or gradual reductions in pressure support. Some studies have shown an increase in patient work of breathing when switched from CMV to SIMV, and others have demonstrated potential detrimental effects of SIMV on respiratory muscles and respiratory drive.

== Mandatory minute ventilation (MMV) ==
Mandatory minute ventilation is a mode which requires the operator to determine what the appropriate minute ventilation for the patient should be, and the ventilator then monitors the patient's ability to generate this volume every 7.5 seconds. If the calculation suggests the volume target will not be met, SIMV breaths are delivered at the targeted volume to achieve the desired minute ventilation. Allows spontaneous breathing with automatic adjustments of mandatory ventilation to the meet the patient’s preset minimum minute volume requirement. If the patient maintains the minute volume settings for VT x f, no mandatory breaths are delivered. If the patient's minute volume is insufficient, mandatory delivery of the preset tidal volume will occur until the minute volume is achieved. The method for monitoring whether or not the patient is meeting the required minute ventilation (V_{E}) is different per ventilator brand and model, but generally there is a window of time being monitored and a smaller window being checked against that larger window (i.e., in the Dräger Evita® line of mechanical ventilators there is a moving 20-second window and every 7 seconds the current tidal volume and rate are measured against to decide if a mechanical breath is needed to maintain the minute ventilation). MMV is the most optimal mode for weaning in neonatal and pediatric populations and has been shown to reduce long term complications related to mechanical ventilation.

== Proportional assist ventilation (PAV) ==
Proportional assist ventilation is a mode in which the ventilator guarantees the percentage of work regardless of changes in pulmonary compliance and resistance. The ventilator varies the tidal volume and pressure based on the patients work of breathing, the amount it delivers is proportional to the percentage of assistance it is set to give.

== Adaptive support ventilation (ASV) ==
Adaptive Support Ventilation is a positive pressure mode of mechanical ventilation that is closed-loop controlled. In this mode, the clinician enters patient ideal body weight and desired level of ventilation in percent of predicted alveolar ventilation and the ventilator then applies inspiratory pressures at a rate which leads to minimal work of breathing. The equation used to calculate this minimal work was derived from the work of Otis et.al. and published and discussed in Grodins and Yamashiro as early as 1977. In the ASV mode, every breath is synchronized with patient effort if such an effort exists, and otherwise, full mechanical ventilation is provided to the patient. Since the first implementation, ASV has undergone a number of refinements and is available on different ventilator brands under different names.

The invention of ASV is claimed by two competing groups, published as scientific article by one group and disclosed as one of the embodiments of US Patent No. 4986268. In this invention, the control algorithm computes the optimal rate of respiration to minimize the work rate of breathing. The rationale is to make the patient's breathing pattern comfortable and natural within safe limits, and thereby stimulate spontaneous breathing and reduce the weaning time.

== See also ==
- Modes of mechanical ventilation
