= Continuous mandatory ventilation =

Continuous mandatory ventilation (CMV) is a mode of mechanical ventilation in which breaths are delivered based on set variables. Still used in the operating room, in previous nomenclature, CMV referred to "controlled mechanical ventilation" ("control mode ventilation"), a mode of ventilation characterized by a ventilator that makes no effort to sense patient breathing effort. In continuous mandatory ventilation, the ventilator can be triggered either by the patient or mechanically by the ventilator. The ventilator is set to deliver a breath according to parameters selected by the operator. "Controlled mechanical ventilation" is an outdated expansion for "CMV"; "continuous mandatory ventilation" is now accepted standard nomenclature for mechanical ventilation. CMV today can assist or control itself dynamically, depending on the transient presence or absence of spontaneous breathing effort. Thus, today's CMV would have been called ACV (assist-control ventilation) in older nomenclature, and the original form of CMV is a thing of the past. But despite continual technological improvement over the past half century, CMV may still be uncomfortable for the patient.

== Expected outcomes and considerations. ==
Continuous mandatory ventilation is associated with profound diaphragm muscle dysfunction and atrophy. CMV is no longer the preferred mode of mechanical ventilation.

== Volume-controlled CMV ==
=== Limit ===
Limits in VC-CMV may be set and pressure based. The ventilator will attempt to deliver the set tidal volume by utilizing whatever pressure is required to reach its setting. A pressure limit may be added to limit damage to the lungs (barotrauma).

=== Cycle ===
Expiration cycling can be set by time or the pressure limit. Once the T_{i} (inspiratory time) is reached, or a pressure limit is reached, the ventilator will cycle into expiratory mode and allow passive exhalation until another breath is triggered.

== Pressure-controlled CMV ==
Pressure control (PC) is a pressure-controlled mode of ventilation. The ventilator delivers a flow to maintain the preset pressure at a preset respiratory rate over a preset inspiratory time.

The pressure is constant during the inspiratory time, and the flow is decelerating. If, for any reason, pressure decreases during inspiration, the flow from the ventilator will immediately increase to maintain the set inspiratory pressure.

== Dual-control modes ==
Dual-control modes are pressure-controlled modes with an exhaled tidal volume target. They work on a breath-by-breath basis and provide pressure-limited, time-cycled breaths, increasing or decreasing the pressure of the next breath as necessary to achieve a user-selected desired tidal volume. They are known by various vendor-specific terms such as pressure-regulated volume control (Siemens), autoflow (Dräger), adaptive-pressure ventilation (Hamilton Medical), and volume-control plus (Covidien), among others.

== Out-dated terminology ==
Many terms have been developed to describe the same modes of mechanical ventilation. The nomenclature of mechanical ventilation has become more standardized, and these terms are no longer preferred but may still be seen in older research. There are many different names that were historically used to refer to CMV but now refer to Assist Control. Names such as volume control ventilation and volume cycled ventilation in modern usage refer to the Assist Control mode.

- Assist/control
- A/C
- CMV
- Volume assist/control
- Volume control
- Volume limited ventilation
- Volume controlled ventilation
- Controlled ventilation
- Volume targeted ventilation

== See also ==
- Continuous spontaneous ventilation
- List of modes of mechanical ventilation by category
- Modes of mechanical ventilation
- Pressure controlled continuous mandatory ventilation
- Pressure controlled intermittent mandatory ventilation
- Volume controlled intermittent mandatory ventilation
