= Lung compliance =

Ratio of volume change per pressure change in the lung

Lung compliance, or pulmonary compliance, is a measure of the lung's ability to stretch and expand (distensibility of elastic tissue). In clinical practice it is separated into two different measurements, static compliance and dynamic compliance. Static lung compliance is the change in volume for any given applied pressure. Dynamic lung compliance is the compliance of the lung at any given time during actual movement of air.

Low compliance indicates a stiff lung (one with high elastic recoil) and can be thought of as a thick balloon – this is the case often seen in fibrosis. High compliance indicates a pliable lung (one with low elastic recoil) and can be thought of as a grocery bag – this is the case often seen in emphysema. Compliance is highest at moderate lung volumes, and much lower at volumes which are very low or very high. The compliance of the lungs demonstrate lung hysteresis; that is, the compliance is different on inspiration and expiration for identical volume.

== Calculation ==
Pulmonary compliance is calculated using the following equation, where ΔV is the change in volume, and ΔP is the change in pleural pressure:

$$Compliance =  \frac{ \Delta V}{ \Delta P}$$

For example, if a patient inhales 500 mL of air from a spirometer with an intrapleural pressure before inspiration of −5 cm H_{2}O and −10 cm H_{2}O at the end of inspiration. Then:

$$Compliance = \frac{\Delta V}{\Delta P} = \frac{.5\;\ce L}{-5\;\ce{cm \, H2O} - (-10\;\ce{cm \, H2O})} = \frac{.5\;\ce L}{5\;\ce{cm \, H2O}} = 0.1\;\ce L\;\times\;\ce{cm \, H2O^{-1}}$$

=== Static compliance (C_{stat}) ===
Static compliance represents pulmonary compliance during periods without gas flow, such as during an inspiratory pause. It can be calculated with the formula:

$$C_{stat} = \frac{V_T}{P_{plat}-\mathrm{PEEP}}$$

where

V_{T} = tidal volume;

P_{plat} = plateau pressure;
PEEP = positive end-expiratory pressure.

P_{plat} is measured at the end of inhalation and prior to exhalation by using an inspiratory hold maneuver. During this maneuver, airflow is transiently (~0.5 sec) discontinued, which eliminates the effects of airway resistance. P_{plat} is never bigger than PIP and is typically <10 cm H_{2}O lower than PIP when airway resistance is not elevated.

=== Dynamic compliance (C_{dyn}) ===
Dynamic compliance represents pulmonary compliance during periods of gas flow, such as during active inspiration. Dynamic compliance is always lesser than or equal to static lung compliance because PIP − PEEP is always greater than P_{plat} − PEEP. It can be calculated using the following equation,

$$C_{dyn} = \frac{V_T}\mathrm{PIP-PEEP}$$

where

C_{dyn} = Dynamic compliance;
V_{T} = tidal volume;
PIP = Peak inspiratory pressure (the maximum pressure during inspiration);
PEEP = Positive End Expiratory Pressure:

Alterations in airway resistance, lung compliance and chest wall compliance influence C_{dyn}.

=== Dimensionality and physical analogues ===
The dimensions of compliance in respiratory physiology are inconsistent with the dimensions of compliance in physics-based applications. In physiology,

$$[C_\text{pulmonary}] = \frac{[\Delta V]}{[\Delta P]} = \frac{L^3}{ML^{-1}T^{-2}} = \frac{L^4T^2}{M},$$

whereas in newtonian physics, compliance is defined as the inverse of the elastic stiffness constant k,

$$[C_\text{physics}] = \frac{1}{[k]} = \frac{[\delta x]}{[F]} = \frac{L}{MLT^{-2}} = \frac{T^2}{M}.$$

Pulmonary compliance is analogous to capacitance.

== Clinical significance ==
Lung compliance is an important measurement in respiratory physiology.

- Decreased pulmonary compliance may be associated with fibrosis.
- Increased pulmonary compliance may be associated with COPD and emphysema due to loss of alveolar and elastic tissue.

Pulmonary surfactant increases compliance by decreasing the surface tension of water. The internal surface of the alveolus is covered with a thin coat of fluid. The water in this fluid has a high surface tension, and provides a force that could collapse the alveolus. The presence of surfactant in this fluid breaks up the surface tension of water, making it less likely that the alveolus can collapse inward. If the alveolus were to collapse, a great force would be required to open it, meaning that compliance would decrease drastically. Lung volume at any given pressure during inhalation is less than the lung volume at any given pressure during exhalation, which is called hysteresis.

== Functional significance of abnormally high or low compliance ==
Low compliance indicates a stiff lung and means extra work is required to bring in a normal volume of air. This occurs as the lungs in this case become fibrotic, lose their distensibility and become stiffer.

In a highly compliant lung, as in emphysema, the elastic tissue is damaged by enzymes. These enzymes are secreted by leukocytes (white blood cells) in response to a variety of inhaled irritants, such as cigarette smoke. Patients with emphysema have a very high lung compliance due to the poor elastic recoil. They have extreme difficulty exhaling air. In this condition extra work is required to get air out of the lungs. In addition, patients often have difficulties inhaling air as well. In emphysema, loss of elastic recoil and alveolar interdependence promotes small-airway closure and regional Atelectasis, increasing closing volume and making inflation at low lung volumes more difficult. Compliance also increases with increasing age.

Both peak inspiratory and plateau pressure increase when elastic resistance increases or when pulmonary compliance decreases (e.g. during abdominal insufflation, ascites, intrinsic lung disease, obesity, pulmonary edema, tension pneumothorax). On the other hand, only peak inspiratory pressure increases (plateau pressure unchanged) when airway resistance increases (e.g. airway compression, bronchospasm, mucous plug, kinked tube, secretions, foreign body).

Compliance decreases in the following cases:

- Supine position
- Laparoscopic surgical interventions
- Severe restrictive pathologies
- Chronic restrictive pathologies
- Hydrothorax
- Pneumothorax
- High standing of a diaphragm
- Acute asthma attacks, where increased compliance also occurs for an unclear reason
