= Tidal volume =

Volume of air displaced between normal inhalation and exhalation

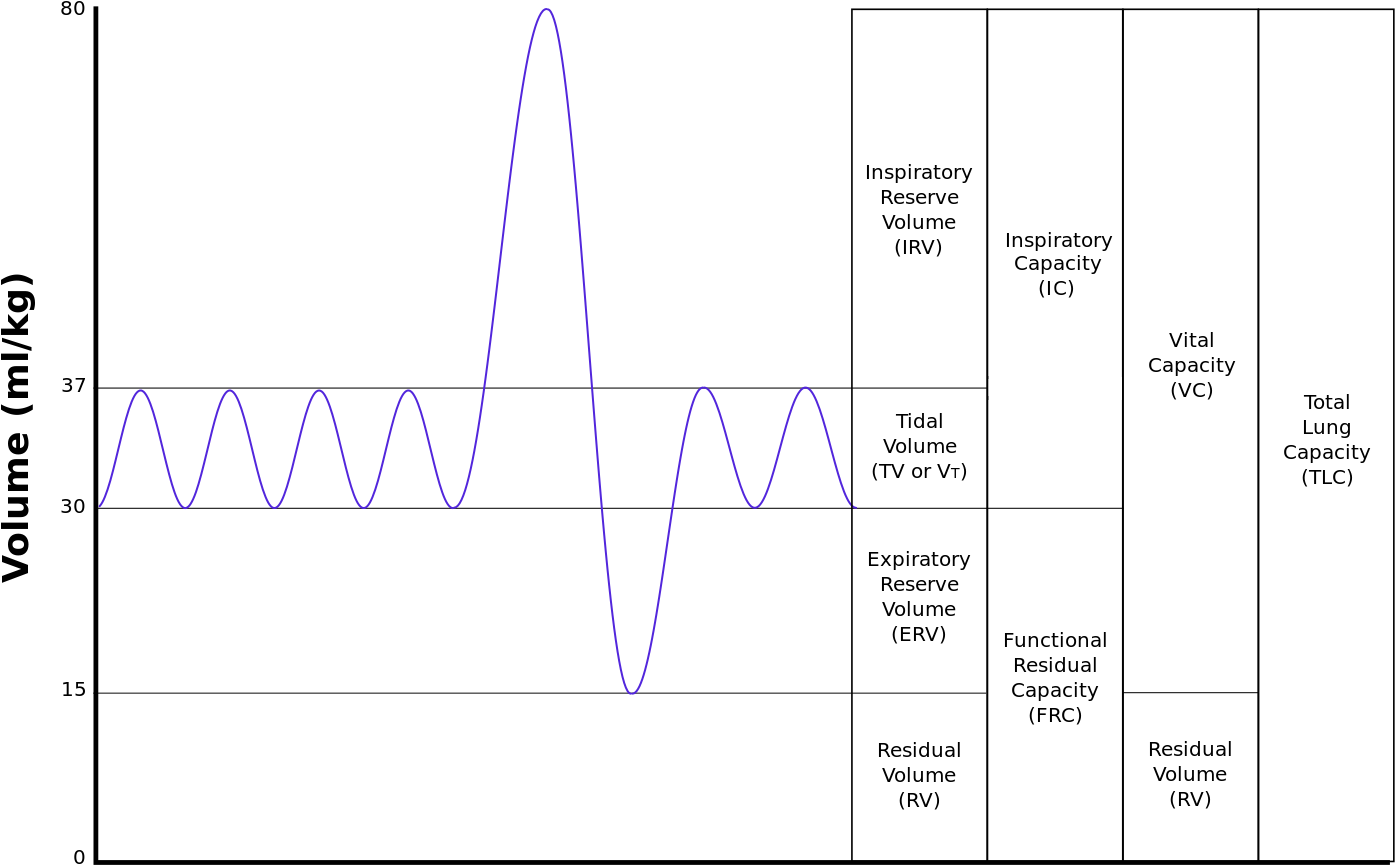
- TLC: Total lung capacity: the volume in the lungs at maximal inflation, the sum of VC and RV.
- TV: Tidal volume: that volume of air moved into or out of the lungs in 1 breath (TV indicates a subdivision of the lung; when tidal volume is precisely measured, as in gas exchange calculation, the symbol TV or V_{T} is used.)
- RV: Residual volume: the volume of air remaining in the lungs after a maximal exhalation
- ERV: Expiratory reserve volume: the maximal volume of air that can be exhaled from the end-expiratory position
- IRV: Inspiratory reserve volume: the maximal volume that can be inhaled from the end-inspiratory level
- IC: Inspiratory capacity: the sum of IRV and TV
- IVC: Inspiratory vital capacity: the maximum volume of air inhaled from the point of maximum expiration
- VC: Vital capacity: the volume of air breathed out after the deepest inhalation.
- V_{T}: Tidal volume: that volume of air moved into or out of the lungs during quiet breathing (VT indicates a subdivision of the lung; when tidal volume is precisely measured, as in gas exchange calculation, the symbol TV or V_{T} is used.)
- FRC: Functional residual capacity: the volume in the lungs at the end-expiratory position
- RV/TLC%: Residual volume expressed as percent of TLC
- V_{A}: Alveolar gas volume
- V_{L}: Actual volume of the lung including the volume of the conducting airway.
- FVC: Forced vital capacity: the determination of the vital capacity from a maximally forced expiratory effort
- FEV_{t}: Forced expiratory volume (time): a generic term indicating the volume of air exhaled under forced conditions in the first t seconds
- FEV_{1}: Volume that has been exhaled at the end of the first second of forced expiration
- FEF_{x}: Forced expiratory flow related to some portion of the FVC curve; modifiers refer to amount of FVC already exhaled
- FEF_{max}: The maximum instantaneous flow achieved during a FVC maneuver
- FIF: Forced inspiratory flow: (Specific measurement of the forced inspiratory curve is denoted by nomenclature analogous to that for the forced expiratory curve. For example, maximum inspiratory flow is denoted FIF_{max}. Unless otherwise specified, volume qualifiers indicate the volume inspired from RV at the point of measurement.)
- PEF: Peak expiratory flow: The highest forced expiratory flow measured with a peak flow meter
- MVV: Maximal voluntary ventilation: volume of air expired in a specified period during repetitive maximal effort

Tidal volume (symbol V_{T} or TV) is the volume of air inspired and expired with each breath. It is typically assumed that the volume of air inhaled is equal to the volume of air exhaled such as in the figure on the right. In a healthy, young human adult, tidal volume is approximately 500 ml per inspiration at rest or 7 ml/kg of body mass.

== Mechanical ventilation ==
Tidal volume plays a significant role during mechanical ventilation to ensure adequate ventilation without causing trauma to the lungs. Tidal volume is measured in milliliters and ventilation volumes are estimated based on a patient's ideal body mass. Measurement of tidal volume can be affected (usually overestimated) by leaks in the breathing circuit or the introduction of additional gas, for example during the introduction of nebulized drugs.

Ventilator-induced lung injury such as Acute lung injury (ALI) /Acute Respiratory Distress Syndrome (ARDS) can be caused by ventilation with very large tidal volumes in normal lungs, as well as ventilation with moderate or small volumes in previously injured lungs, and research shows that the incidence of ALI increases with higher tidal volume settings in nonneurologically impaired patients. . Similarly A 2018 systematic review by The Cochrane Collaboration provided evidence that low tidal volume ventilation reduced post operative pneumonia and reduced the requirement for both invasive and non invasive ventilation after surgery

Initial settings of mechanical ventilation:

=== Patients without pre-existing lung disease ===
Protective lung ventilation strategies should be applied with V_{T} 6ml/kg to 8ml/kg with RR = 12 to 20 and an average starting target minute ventilation of 7 L/min.

=== Patients with chronic obstructive lung disease ===
Protective lung volumes apply 6ml/kg to 8ml/kg with a rate high enough for proper alveolar ventilation but does not create or aggravate intrinsic Positive End-Expiry Pressure (PEEP).

=== Acute respiratory distress syndrome ===
Protective lung ventilation strategies apply. V_{T} 6 to 8 ml/kg or as low as 5 ml/kg in severe cases. Permissive hypercapnia can be employed in an attempt to minimize aggressive ventilation leading to lung injury. Higher PEEPs are often required however not all ARDS patients require the same PEEP levels. Patient should be started on 6 ml/kg and PEEP increased until plateau pressure is 30 cm H_{2}0 in most severe cases.
