= Modes of mechanical ventilation =

Modes of mechanical ventilation refer to the various mechanical ventilator strategies employed to deliver a breath in patients that require mechanical ventilation. The mode refers to the method of respiratory support. In general, mode selection is based on clinician familiarity and institutional preferences, since there is a paucity of evidence indicating that the mode affects clinical outcome. The most frequently used forms of volume-limited mechanical ventilation are intermittent mandatory ventilation (IMV) and continuous mandatory ventilation (CMV).

== Terminology ==
There has been extensive discussion regarding the nomenclature of mechanical ventilation, particularly in relation to the classification and terminology of ventilation modes. Despite these efforts, considerable confusion persists in the field. Ongoing initiatives aim to standardize and clarify this terminology, and, more recently, the International Organization for Standardization has revised its relevant standards to incorporate more precise definitions for modes of ventilation.

== Taxonomy for mechanical ventilation ==
The taxonomy is a logical classification system based on 10 maxims of ventilator design:

=== How modes are classified ===
1. A structured method is commonly used to classify modes of mechanical ventilation based on three key attributes: the control variable, the breath sequence, and the targeting scheme.

The control variable is the parameter directly regulated during inspiration. It is classified as pressure when inspiration is initiated with a preset inspiratory pressure or when pressure varies in proportion to inspiratory effort. It is classified as volume when both tidal volume and inspiratory flow are preset. If neither condition applies, the control variable is categorized as time.

The breath sequence is determined by analyzing whether breath initiation (triggering) and termination (cycling) are controlled by the patient or the ventilator. Based on these characteristics, breaths may be classified as mandatory or spontaneous and organized into sequences such as continuous mandatory ventilation (CMV) or intermittent mandatory ventilation (IMV).

The targeting scheme describes how the ventilator achieves the desired breath parameters. This may involve fixed operator-defined settings (set-point targeting) or dynamic adjustments made by the ventilator to achieve a specified goal (adaptive targeting), among other approaches.

=== Examples of mode classification ===
Assist/Control Volume Control (e.g., Covidien PB 840)

In this mode, inspiratory volume and flow are preset, establishing volume as the control variable. Each breath is volume-cycled, meaning that inspiration is terminated by the ventilator; such breaths are therefore classified as mandatory. Because all breaths are mandatory, the breath sequence is continuous mandatory ventilation (CMV). The operator directly sets the waveform parameters, indicating a set-point targeting scheme. Accordingly, the mode may be classified as volume-controlled continuous mandatory ventilation with set-point targeting (VC-CMV).

SIMV Volume Control Plus (e.g., Covidien PB 840)

In this mode, the operator sets the tidal volume but not the inspiratory flow. Since specifying volume alone is insufficient to define volume control, the control variable is classified as pressure. The presence of spontaneous breaths between mandatory breaths defines the breath sequence as intermittent mandatory ventilation (IMV). The ventilator adjusts inspiratory pressure between breaths to achieve a target average tidal volume, reflecting an adaptive targeting scheme. This mode may therefore be classified as pressure-controlled intermittent mandatory ventilation with adaptive targeting (PC-IMV, adaptive).

== Descriptions of common modes ==
Mechanical ventilation machines are available with both invasive modes (such as intubation) and non-invasive modes (such as BPAP). Invasive has to do with the insertion of medical devices or tubes internal to the patient, while non-invasive is completely external to the patient, as for example in using a tightly fitting mask or other device that covers the patient's nose and mouth.

=== Assist mode, control mode, and assist-control mode ===
A basic distinction in mechanical ventilation is whether each breath is initiated by the patient (assist mode) or by the machine (control mode). Dynamic hybrids of the two (assist-control modes) are also possible, and control mode without assist is now mostly obsolete.

=== Airway pressure release ventilation ===
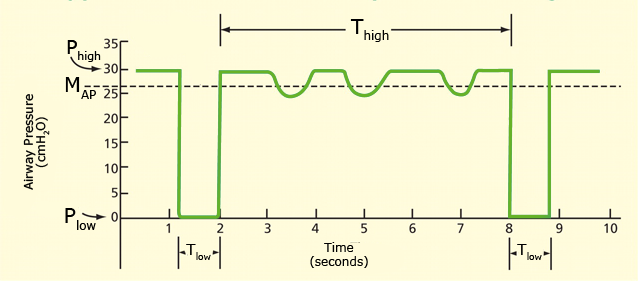
Airway pressure release ventilation graph

Airway pressure release ventilation is a time-cycled alternant between two levels of positive airway pressure, with the main time on the high level and a brief expiratory release to facilitate ventilation.

Airway pressure release ventilation needs to be well understood to use it effectively and to prevent ventilator-induced lung injury. The exhalation time (T_{low}) is shortened to usually less than one second to maintain alveoli inflation. In the basic sense, this is a continuous pressure with a brief release.

Different perceptions of this mode may exist around the globe. While 'APRV' is common to users in North America, a very similar mode, biphasic positive airway pressure (BIPAP), was introduced in Europe. The term APRV has also been used in American journals where, from the ventilation characteristics, BIPAP would have been perfectly good terminology. But BiPAP is a trademark for a noninvasive ventilation mode in a specific ventilator (Respironics Inc.).

Other manufacturers have followed with their own brand names (BILEVEL, DUOPAP, BIVENT). Although similar in modality, these terms describe how a mode is intended to inflate the lung, rather than defining the characteristics of synchronization or the way spontaneous breathing efforts are supported.

Intermittent mandatory ventilation has not always had the synchronized feature, so the division of modes were understood to be SIMV (synchronized) vs IMV (not-synchronized). Since the American Association for Respiratory Care established a nomenclature of mechanical ventilation the "synchronized" part of the title has been dropped and now there is only IMV.

=== Mandatory minute ventilation ===
Mandatory minute ventilation (MMV) allows spontaneous breathing with automatic adjustments of mandatory ventilation to the meet the patient's preset minimum minute volume requirement. If the patient maintains the minute volume settings for V_{T} x f, no mandatory breaths are delivered.

If the patient's minute volume is insufficient, mandatory delivery of the preset tidal volume will occur until the minute volume is achieved. The method for monitoring whether or not the patient is meeting the required minute ventilation (V_{E}) differs by ventilator brand and model, but, in general, there is a window of monitored time, and a smaller window checked against the larger window (i.e., in the Dräger Evita® line of mechanical ventilators there is a moving 20-second window, and every 7 seconds the current tidal volume and rate are measured) to decide whether a mechanical breath is needed to maintain the minute ventilation.

MMV is an optimal mode for weaning in neonatal and pediatric populations and has been shown to reduce long-term complications related to mechanical ventilation.

=== Pressure-regulated volume control ===
Pressure-regulated volume control is an Assist Controlled Ventilation (ACV) based mode. Pressure-regulated volume control utilizes pressure-limited, volume-targeted, time-cycled breaths that can be either ventilator- or patient-initiated.

The peak inspiratory pressure delivered by the ventilator is varied on a breath-to-breath basis to achieve a target tidal volume that is set by the clinician.

For example, if a target tidal volume of 500 mL is set but the ventilator delivers 600 mL, the next breath will be delivered with a lower inspiratory pressure to achieve a lower tidal volume. Though PRVC is regarded as a hybrid mode because of its tidal-volume (VC) settings and pressure-limiting (PC) settings fundamentally PRVC is a pressure-control mode with adaptive targeting.

=== Continuous positive airway pressure ===
Continuous positive airway pressure (CPAP) is a non-invasive positive pressure mode of respiratory support. CPAP is a continuous pressure applied to keep the alveoli open and not fully deflate. This mechanism for maintaining inflated alveoli helps increase partial pressure of oxygen in arterial blood, an appropriate increase in CPAP increases the PaO_{2}.

==== Automatic positive airway pressure ====
Automatic positive airway pressure (APAP) is a form of CPAP that automatically tunes the amount of pressure delivered to the patient to the minimum required to maintain an unobstructed airway on a breath-by-breath basis by measuring the resistance in the patient's breathing.

=== Bilevel positive airway pressure ===
Bilevel positive airway pressure (BPAP) is a mode used during non-invasive ventilation (NIV). First used in 1988 by Professor Benzer in Austria, it delivers a preset inspiratory positive airway pressure (IPAP) and expiratory positive airway pressure (EPAP). BPAP can be described as a Continuous Positive Airway Pressure system with a time-cycle change of the applied CPAP level.

CPAP/APAP, BPAP, and other non-invasive ventilation modes have been shown to be effective management tools for chronic obstructive pulmonary disease, acute respiratory failure, sleep apnea, etc.

Often BPAP is incorrectly referred to as "BiPAP". BiPAP is the name of a portable ventilator manufactured by Respironics Corporation; it is just one of many ventilators that can deliver BPAP.

==== Medical uses ====
BPAP has been shown to be useful in reducing mortality and reducing the need for endotracheal intubation when used in people with chronic obstructive pulmonary disease (COPD).

=== High-frequency ventilation (Active) ===
The term active refers to the ventilator's forced expiratory system. In a HFV-A scenario, the ventilator uses pressure to apply an inspiratory breath and then applies an opposite pressure to force an expiratory breath. In high-frequency oscillatory ventilation (sometimes abbreviated HFOV) the oscillation bellows and piston force positive pressure in and apply negative pressure to force an expiration.

=== High-frequency ventilation (Passive) ===
The term passive refers to the ventilator's non-forced expiratory system. In a HFV-P scenario, the ventilator uses pressure to apply an inspiratory breath and then returns to atmospheric pressure to allow for a passive expiration.

This is seen in High-Frequency Jet Ventilation, sometimes abbreviated HFJV. Also categorized under High Frequency Ventilation is High Frequency Percussive Ventilation, sometimes abbreviated HFPV. With HFPV it utilizes an open circuit to deliver its subtidal volumes by way of the patient interface known as the Phasitron.

=== Volume guarantee ===
Volume guarantee an additional parameter available in many types of ventilators that allows the ventilator to change its inspiratory pressure setting to achieve a minimum tidal volume. This is utilized most often in neonatal patients who need a pressure controlled mode with a consideration for volume control to minimize volutrauma.

== Spontaneous breathing and support settings ==
=== Positive end-expiratory pressure ===
Positive end expiratory pressure (PEEP) is pressure applied upon expiration. PEEP is applied using either a valve that is connected to the expiratory port and set manually or a valve managed internally by a mechanical ventilator.

PEEP is a pressure that an exhalation has to bypass, in effect causing alveoli to remain open and not fully deflate. This mechanism for maintaining inflated alveoli helps increase partial pressure of oxygen in arterial blood, and an increase in PEEP increases the PaO_{2}.

=== Pressure support ===
Pressure support is a spontaneous mode of ventilation also named Pressure Support Ventilation (PSV). The patient initiates every breath and the ventilator delivers support with the preset pressure value. With support from the ventilator, the patient also regulates their own respiratory rate and their tidal volume.

In Pressure Support, the set inspiratory pressure support level is kept constant and there is a decelerating flow. The patient triggers all breaths. If there is a change in the mechanical properties of the lung/thorax and patient effort, the delivered tidal volume will be affected. The user must then regulate the pressure support level to obtain desired ventilation.

Pressure support improves oxygenation, ventilation and decreases work of breathing.

Also see adaptive support ventilation.

== Other ventilation modes and strategies ==
=== Flow-controlled ventilation ===
Flow-controlled ventilation (FCV) is an entirely dynamic ventilation mode, without pauses, with continuous and stable gas flows during both inspiration and expiration, aiming for linear changes in both volume and pressure. FCV is an invasive ventilation mode but, unlike Volume- and pressure controlled modes, it does not rely on a passive expiration created by collapse of the thoracic wall and elastic recoil of the lungs. A high resistant breathing circuit inhibits a passive expiration and therewith allows to fully control and stabilize the expiration flow. FCV creates an inspiration by generating a stable flow from a set End-expiratory pressure (EEP) to a set Peak pressure. Then a stable expiratory flow is created by suctioning. This expiratory flow rate is preferably similar to the inspiratory flow, aiming for an I:E ratio of 1:1.0, to minimize energy dissipation in the lungs. FCV is a more efficient ventilation as compared to conventional modes, allows ventilation through even small lumens (~2 – 10 mm ID) and results in less applied mechanical power. FCV was invented by Professor Dr. med. Dietmar Enk.

=== Negative pressure ventilation ===
Main article: Negative pressure ventilator

Negative-pressure ventilation stimulates (or forces) breathing by periodic application of partial vacuum (air pressure reduced below ambient pressure), applied externally to the patient's torso—specifically, chest and abdomen—to assist (or force) the chest to expand, expanding the lungs, resulting in voluntary (or involuntary) inhalation through the patient's airway.

Various "negative pressure ventilators" (NPVs) have been developed to serve this function—most famously the "Iron lung," a tank in which the patient lays, with only their head exposed to ambient air, while air pressure on the remainder of their body, inside the tank, is varied by pumping, to stimulate chest and lung expansion and contraction. Though not in wide use today, NPVs were the principal forms of hospital and long-term mechanical ventilation in the first half of the 20th century, and remain in limited use today.

=== Closed loop systems ===
==== Adaptive Support Ventilation ASV and Adaptive Ventilation Mode AVM ====
These Modes uses employ optimal targeting in which frequency and tidal volume of breaths of a patient on the ventilator are automatically adjusted and optimized to mimic natural breathing, stimulate spontaneous breathing, and reduce weaning time. In the ASV mode, every breath is synchronized with patient effort if such an effort exists, and otherwise, full mechanical ventilation is provided to the patient.

==== Automatic Tube Compensation ====
Automatic tube compensation (ATC) is a ventilator function that compensates for the flow-dependent pressure drop across an endotracheal or tracheostomy tube. In its original description as a stand-alone mode, ATC used calculated tracheal pressure as the controlled variable. When ATC is applied without additional pressure support, the target tracheal pressure is kept constant at the set positive end-expiratory pressure (PEEP) during inspiration and expiration.

The physiological goal of ATC is to reduce or offset the additional resistive work imposed by the artificial airway, so that the patient breathes as if the endotracheal or tracheostomy tube were not present.

==== Neurally Adjusted Ventilatory Assist ====
Neurally Adjusted Ventilatory Assist (NAVA) is adjusted by a computer (servo) and is similar to ATC but with more complex requirements for implementation.

In terms of patient-ventilator synchrony, NAVA supports both resistive and elastic work of breathing in proportion to the patient's inspiratory effort

==== Proportional Assist Ventilation ====
Proportional assist ventilation (PAV) is another servo targeting based mode in which the ventilator guarantees the percentage of work regardless of changes in pulmonary compliance and resistance.

The ventilator varies the tidal volume and pressure based on the patient's work of breathing. The amount it delivers is proportional to the percentage of assistance it is set to give.

PAV, like NAVA, supports both restrictive and elastic work of breathing in proportion to the patient's inspiratory effort.

=== Liquid ventilation ===
Liquid ventilation is a technique of mechanical ventilation in which the lungs are insufflated with an oxygenated perfluorochemical liquid rather than an oxygen-containing gas mixture. The use of perfluorochemicals, rather than nitrogen, as the inert carrier of oxygen and carbon dioxide offers a number of theoretical advantages for the treatment of acute lung injury, including:

- Reducing surface tension by maintaining a fluid interface with alveoli
- Opening of collapsed alveoli by hydraulic pressure with a lower risk of barotrauma
- Providing a reservoir in which oxygen and carbon dioxide can be exchanged with pulmonary capillary blood
- Functioning as a high-efficiency heat exchanger

Despite its theoretical advantages, efficacy studies have been disappointing and the optimal clinical use of LV has yet to be defined.

==== Total liquid ventilation ====
In total liquid ventilation (TLV), the entire lung is filled with an oxygenated PFC liquid, and a liquid tidal volume of PFC is actively pumped into and out of the lungs. A specialized apparatus is required to deliver and remove the relatively dense, viscous PFC tidal volumes, and to extracorporeally oxygenate and remove carbon dioxide from the liquid.

==== Partial liquid ventilation ====
In partial liquid ventilation (PLV), the lungs are slowly filled with a volume of PFC equivalent or close to the FRC during gas ventilation. The PFC within the lungs is oxygenated and carbon dioxide is removed by means of gas breaths cycling in the lungs by a conventional gas ventilator.

== See also ==
- Table of modes of mechanical ventilation
- Mechanical ventilation – Method to mechanically assist or replace spontaneous breathing
- Prone ventilation
- Respiratory therapist – Practitioner in cardio-pulmonary medicine
- Bubble CPAP – Noninvasive form of ventilation for newborns
