= Hamman =

Surname list

Hamman is a surname. Notable people with the surname include:

- Adalbert Hamman (1910–2000), French Franciscan priest
- Bob Hamman (born 1938), American bridge player
- Edouard Hamman (1819–1888), Belgian painter
- Jared Hamman (born 1982)
- John Hamman (1927–2000)
- Louis Virgil Hamman (1877–1946), American medical researcher
  - Hamman-Rich syndrome
  - Hamman's sign
  - Hamman's syndrome
- Mary Hamman (1907–1984)
- Petra Hamman (born 1946)
- Phillip Hamman (c. 1753 – 1832)
- Shane Hamman (born 1972), American weightlifter

== See also ==
- Hamam (disambiguation)
