= Hamman's syndrome =

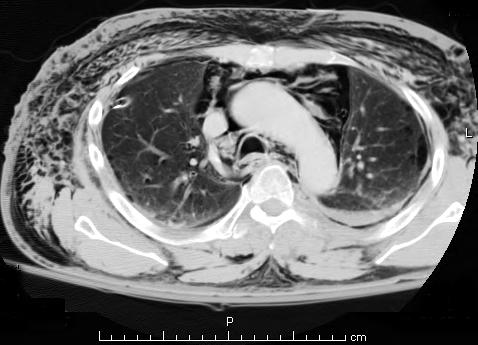
- A CT scan showing air in the mediastinum with subcutaneous emphysema, which can result in Hamman's syndrome
- Specialty: Pulmonology

Hamman's syndrome, also known as Macklin's syndrome, is a syndrome of spontaneous subcutaneous emphysema (air in the subcutaneous tissues of the skin) and pneumomediastinum (air in the mediastinum, the center of the chest cavity), sometimes associated with pain and, less commonly, dyspnea (difficulty breathing), dysphonia, and a low-grade fever.

Hamman's syndrome can cause Hamman's sign, an unusual combination of sounds that can be heard with a stethoscope.

== Causes ==
The cause of Hamman's syndrome is most commonly unknown (idiopathic).

Excessive duration and/or intensity of activities that mimic valsalva manoeuvres, i.e. that increase intrathoracic pressure, can cause barotrauma, and hence pregnancy (and constipation and other causes of excessive straining) can be a precipitating cause of Hamman's syndrome. Indeed, it is estimated to occur in approximately 1 in 100,000 live births and is associated with prolonged labour times.

Additionally, vomiting and coughing have also been noted as occasional precipitating factors. Hamman's is thus unsurprisingly occasionally known to be associated with asthma (i.e. frequent coughing), excessive alcohol use (i.e. frequent vomiting) and inhalational illicit substance use (such as cocaine use).

Despite these associations, often, no precipitating cause is found.

== Pathophysiology ==
Macklin described the pathophysiology of Hamman's syndrome to be barotrauma, whereby rupture of alveolar membranes causes a positive pressure gradient of air from the lungs into the mediastinum (the Macklin effect).

== Treatment ==
Treatment is supportive. Hamman's syndrome tends to be benign and self-limiting. It is important to differentiate it from far more serious conditions that have similar symptoms, such as Boerhaave's syndrome.

== History ==
It was named after clinician Louis Hamman, M.D.
