= HFV (disambiguation) =

HFV may refer to:

- Human foamy virus
- High frequency ventilation, medical ventilation
- Hessian Football Association, Germany
