= Redemptionis donum =

Post-synodal apostolic exhortation of John Paul II

Redemptionis donum Latin for 'The gift of the Redemption' Apostolic exhortation of Pope John Paul II
- Signature date: 22 November 2001
- Number: 3 of 15 of the pontificate
- Text: In Latin; In English

Redemptionis donum (English: The gift of the Redemption) is a post-synodal apostolic exhortation of Pope John Paul II, signed on 25 March 1984.

Written at the sole initiative of the Pope, the document speaks of religious consecration in the light of the mystery of Redemption. John Paul II signed it on March 25, 1984, on the Solemnity of the Annunciation falling in the liturgical calendar of the Catholic Church. After the Second Vatican Council, there was a crisis in the number of vocations for the religious orders. Many religious men and women left their monasteries. The exhortation was an attempt to introduce the ideal of consecrated life. It highlights the theology, spirituality and apostolic dimension of religious life. The Pope presented religious life in its trinitarian, paschal and eschatological dimensions.
