= Paschal mystery =

Central concept of the Catholic faith

The Paschal mystery is central to Catholic faith and theology relating to the history of salvation. According to the Compendium of the Catechism of the Catholic Church, "The Paschal Mystery of Jesus, which comprises his passion, death, resurrection, and glorification, stands at the center of the Christian faith because God's saving plan was accomplished once for all by the redemptive death of himself as Jesus Christ." The Catechism states that in the liturgy of the Church "it is principally his own Paschal mystery that Christ signifies and makes present."

Catholic, Anglican, Lutheran, and Orthodox Christian churches celebrate this mystery during Holy Week and Easter. It is recalled and celebrated also during every Eucharist, and especially on a Sunday, which according to Catholicism is the Pascha of the week.

== Background ==
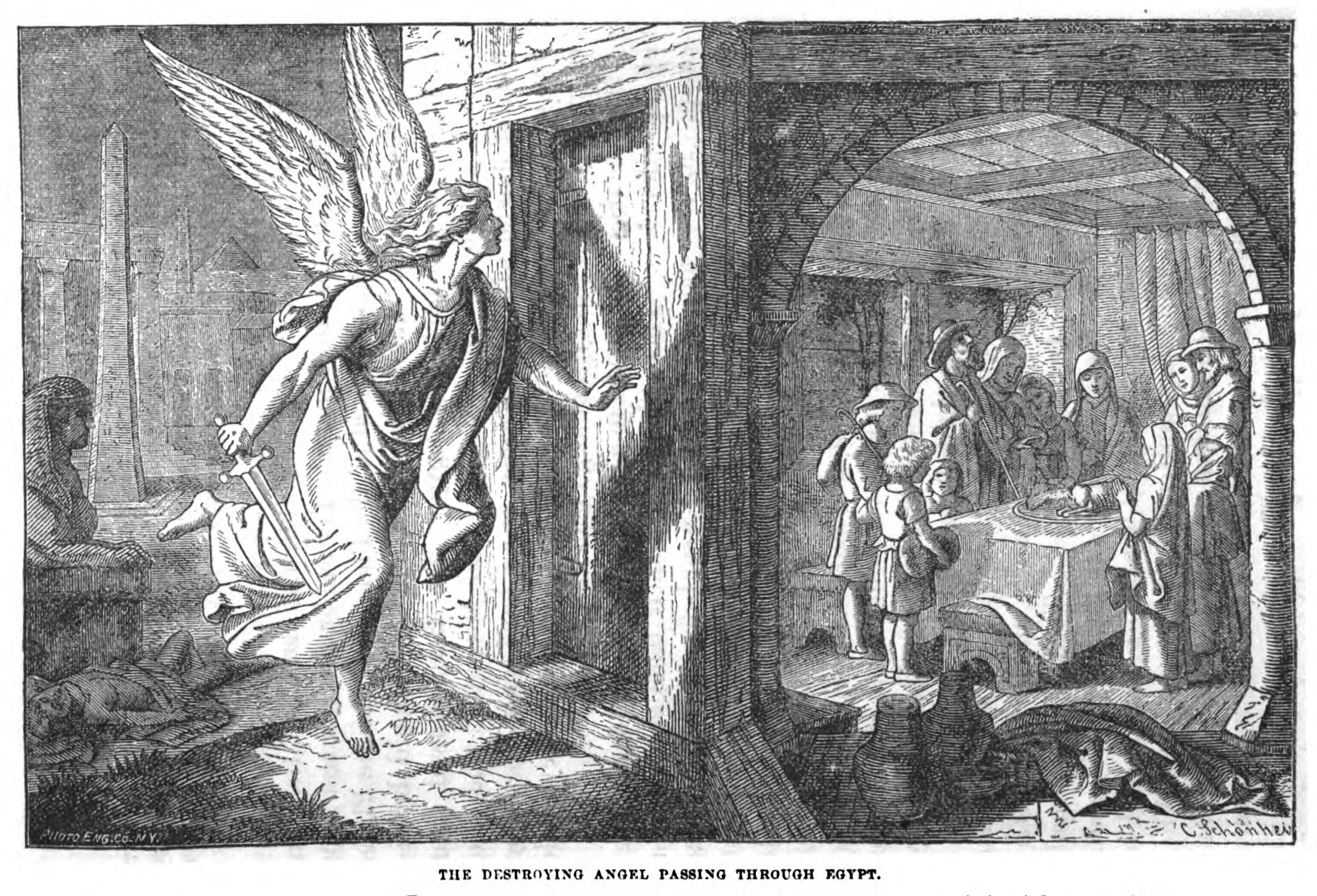
The destroying angel passes through Egypt

According to the Book of Exodus, God commanded Moses to tell the Israelites to mark a lamb's blood above their doors in order that the Angel of Death would pass over them. Paschal refers to the passage of God's destroying angel on the night of Passover. The angel "passed over" the houses of the Israelites but killed the firstborn child in the houses of the Egyptians.

Catholicism says that a sacred mystery is a divine mystery which cannot be grasped by mere human reasoning and can only be revealed by God through grace.

== Patristic spiritual and theological aspects ==
The first known use of the term Paschal mystery (literally Mystery of the Pascha) was found in the homily of Melito of Sardis On the Pascha written between A.D. 160 and 170:

Understand, therefore, beloved,

how it is new and old,
eternal and temporary,
perishable and imperishable,
mortal and immortal, this mystery of the Pascha:
old as regards the force
but new as regards the Word;
temporary as regards the model (gr. typos),
eternal because of grace
perishable because of the slaughter of the sheep,
imperishable because of the life of the Lord;
mortal because of the burial in earth,
immortal because of the rising from the dead

— On the Pascha, 2–3

According to Raniero Cantalamessa, the patristic interpretation of the paschal mystery in its major facets and constituent dimensions may be summarized in four points:

1. History. Historical events form the foundation for the Paschal mystery and are commemorated in the paschal liturgy of Easter
2. Sacraments and mystagogy. Historical events of the death and resurrection of Christ are realized in the believer as passage from death to life. Primarily, it is achieved in baptism and the Eucharist, but the paschal solemnity of Easter taken as a whole is itself a sacrament, the paschal sacramentum.
3. Moral and spiritual life. Pascha (or Easter) is a transitus – detachment from evil, conversion to good, and progress in spiritual life, until the final transitus to the Kingdom of God.
4. Eschatology. In the early years of the Church Paschal mystery was celebrated with a vivid expectation of the coming of Christ. Gradually Christian communities have come to focus on the presence of Christ in the Church as liturgical anticipation of the parousia. Paschal eschatology has also individual dimension as eagerness for the heavenly Pascha. Paschal mystery becomes a pledge of eternal life.

== Catholic teaching ==
The Compendium of the Catechism of the Catholic Church, states that "The Paschal Mystery of Jesus, which comprises his passion, death, resurrection, and glorification, stands at the center of the Christian faith because God's saving plan was accomplished once for all by the redemptive death of his Son Jesus Christ."

=== The Second Vatican Council ===
According to Pope Benedict XVI, the most important and essential message of the council is "the Paschal Mystery as the center of what it is to be Christian and therefore of the Christian life, the Christian year, the Christian seasons". The term Mysterium paschale was used repeatedly during Second Vatican Council (1963–65) as a meaningful designation of the Christian redemption proclaimed and now accomplished in the liturgy. Council Fathers endorsed the fruit of the work of scholars of the Liturgical Movement, specifically Dom Odo Casel and the whole Maria Laach Abbey. The term mystery of salvation made its way to the Council documents not without some opposition or misunderstanding. Some fathers expressed doubts saying that it was a vague and chimeric idea, its orthodoxy was dubious, and that it was ignored by sound theology. Eventually the Council decided to confirm the importance of the term. It is reflected especially in the Constitution on the liturgy Sacrosanctum Concilium. In the very beginning of 1st chapter, where the Council document speaks about restoration and promotion of the liturgy, paschal mystery is shown as the way Christ has redeemed mankind:

The wonderful works of God among the people of the Old Testament were but a prelude to the work of Christ the Lord in redeeming mankind and giving perfect glory to God. He achieved His task principally by the paschal mystery of His blessed passion, resurrection from the dead, and the glorious ascension, whereby "dying, he destroyed our death and, rising, he restored our life". For it was from the side of Christ as He slept the sleep of death upon the cross that there came forth "the wondrous sacrament of the whole Church."

— Constitution Sacrosanctum Concilium 5; cf. n. 10, 47, 61

=== Post-Conciliar magisterial documents ===
After Second Vatican Council the term Paschal mystery has been used by Catholic Church Magisterium as one of basic concepts of Christian faith and life.

The Catechism of the Catholic Church states that "The Paschal mystery of Christ's cross and Resurrection stands at the center of the Good News that the apostles, and the Church following them, are to proclaim to the world. God's saving plan was accomplished 'once for all' by the redemptive death of his Son Jesus Christ." (CCC 571)

In describing the sacramental system of the church or the sacramental economy, the Catechism dedicates one chapter on the Paschal mystery in the Age of the Church. It teaches that "In the liturgy of the Church, it is principally his own Paschal mystery that Christ signifies and makes present. During his earthly life Jesus announced his Paschal mystery by his teaching and anticipated it by his actions. When his Hour comes, he lives out the unique event of history which does not pass away: Jesus dies, is buried, rises from the dead, and is seated at the right hand of the Father 'once for all.'

"His Paschal mystery is a real event that occurred in our history, but it is unique: all other historical events happen once, and then they pass away, swallowed up in the past. The Paschal mystery of Christ, by contrast, cannot remain only in the past, because by his death he destroyed death, and all that Christ is - all that he did and suffered for all men - participates in the divine eternity, and so transcends all times while being made present in them all. The event of the Cross and Resurrection abides and draws everything toward life." (CCC 1085)

It also said that "The Paschal mystery has two aspects: by his death, Christ liberates us from sin; by his Resurrection, he opens for us the way to a new life. This new life is above all justification that reinstates us in God's grace, 'so that as Christ was raised from the dead by the glory of the Father, we too might walk in newness of life.'Justification consists in both victory over the death caused by sin and a new participation in grace. It brings about filial adoption so that men become Christ's brethren." (CCC 654)

In 1992 letter Communionis notio of the Congregation for the Doctrine of the Faith to the bishops about the Church understood as communion, paschal mystery is described as the means by which God's initiative was carried out to bring to disciples of Christ and, indeed, to the whole of mankind the gift of communion.

John Paul II in his letter on keeping the Lord's day holy wrote that to celebrate Sunday is to make present the graces of the Paschal mystery, which is the climax of the salvation history:

The Paschal Mystery of Christ is the full revelation of the mystery of the world's origin, the climax of the history of salvation and the anticipation of the eschatological fulfilment of the world. What God accomplished in Creation and wrought for his People in the Exodus has found its fullest expression in Christ's Death and Resurrection, though its definitive fulfilment will not come until the Parousia, when Christ returns in glory. In him, the "spiritual" meaning of the Sabbath is fully realized, as Saint Gregory the Great declares: "For us, the true Sabbath is the person of our Redeemer, our Lord Jesus Christ."

— Dies Domini, 18

The document called Instrumentum Laboris, issued before the Synod on the Eucharist (2005), spoke about perception of the Eucharistic mystery among the faithful. In many developed countries Christians fail to see the Eucharist as a celebration of the paschal mystery. They tend to perceive it as simply the fulfilment of a Sunday obligation and a meal of fellowship. The paschal mystery, celebrated in an unbloody manner on the altar, is much more a source of spiritual strength to those Christians who live in the situation of suffering, wars, and natural disasters etc.

During the 2005 Synod, Pope Benedict XVI and bishops emphasised the need for the faithful to enter more deeply into the mystery being celebrated. They called for a process of mystagogy, i.e. initiation into the mystery of Salvation. According to the Pope's exhortation published after the Synod, initiation into the mystery of the liturgy should respect three elements:

- Interpretation of the events of Jesus' life, and the Paschal mystery in particular, in relation to the entire history of the Old Testament.
- Introduction into the meaning of the signs and gestures of the rites. In a highly technological age people no longer understand them.
- Safeguarding the impact celebration of the rites should have on Christian life in all its dimensions – work and responsibility, thoughts and emotions, activity and repose.

Pope called for new communities and movements to assist in the practical realisation of that programme in parishes:

Each Christian community is called to be a place where people can be taught about the mysteries celebrated in faith. In this regard, the Synod Fathers called for greater involvement by communities of consecrated life, movements and groups which, by their specific charisms, can give new impetus to Christian formation. In our time, too, the Holy Spirit freely bestows his gifts to sustain the apostolic mission of the Church, which is charged with spreading the faith and bringing it to maturity.

— Exhortation Sacramentum Caritatis, 64

Among the new communities of consecrated life which contribute to the Christian formation there are e.g. Community of St. John, Community of the Lamb, Monastic Fraternities of Jerusalem and others. The Pope spoke also about new movements and groups working in the field of Christian formation. Among internationally active there are e.g. Charismatic Renewal, Communion and Liberation, Community of the Beatitudes, Community of the Chemin Neuf, Community of Sant'Egidio, Emmanuel Community, Focolare Movement, Neocatechumenal Way, Opus Dei, etc. These communities, movements and groups have emerged in the 20th century on the grounds of Second Vatican Council's renewal of the Church.

=== Paschal mystery and the traditionalists ===
The concept of the paschal mystery is criticised by the traditionalists. According to the address of the Superior of the Society of St. Pius X, Bishop Bernard Fellay (2001), the theology of the "paschal mystery" minimizes the mystery of the Redemption, because it considers the sacrament only in its relation with the "mystery", and because the conception that it makes of the "memorial" alters the sacrificial dimension of the Mass and as a consequence it renders the post-Conciliar Liturgy dangerously distant from Catholic doctrine. Card. Joseph Ratzinger and Fr. Jonathan Robinson CO of the Toronto Oratory assert that the traditionalists put themselves in a false position, overlooking the fact that the Vatican II's teaching about this issue restored a profoundly traditional doctrine, central to Christian thought and experience.

== Protestant view ==
The Protestant view of grace and salvation was strongly influenced by the nominalism of William Ockham's razor. In Martin Luther's opinion Ockham was the only scholastic whose teaching was worth studying. Rejection of traditional Metaphysics, and especially the universals, paved the way to modern empiricism. In this nominalistic Protestant view of relationship between God and creation, the mystery of God becomes utterly unattainable for human reason, even if it is illumined by faith. While traditional understanding of the mystery of faith is that the Divine revelation can use human word, somehow assimilating the Word of God, to initiate man into the mystery of the divine life, according to Louis Bouyer, the Protestant view excludes such approach. Revelation of the mystery of salvation to man is compatible with traditional philosophy, like Thomism, and incompatible with the Protestant view of grace influenced by nominalism.

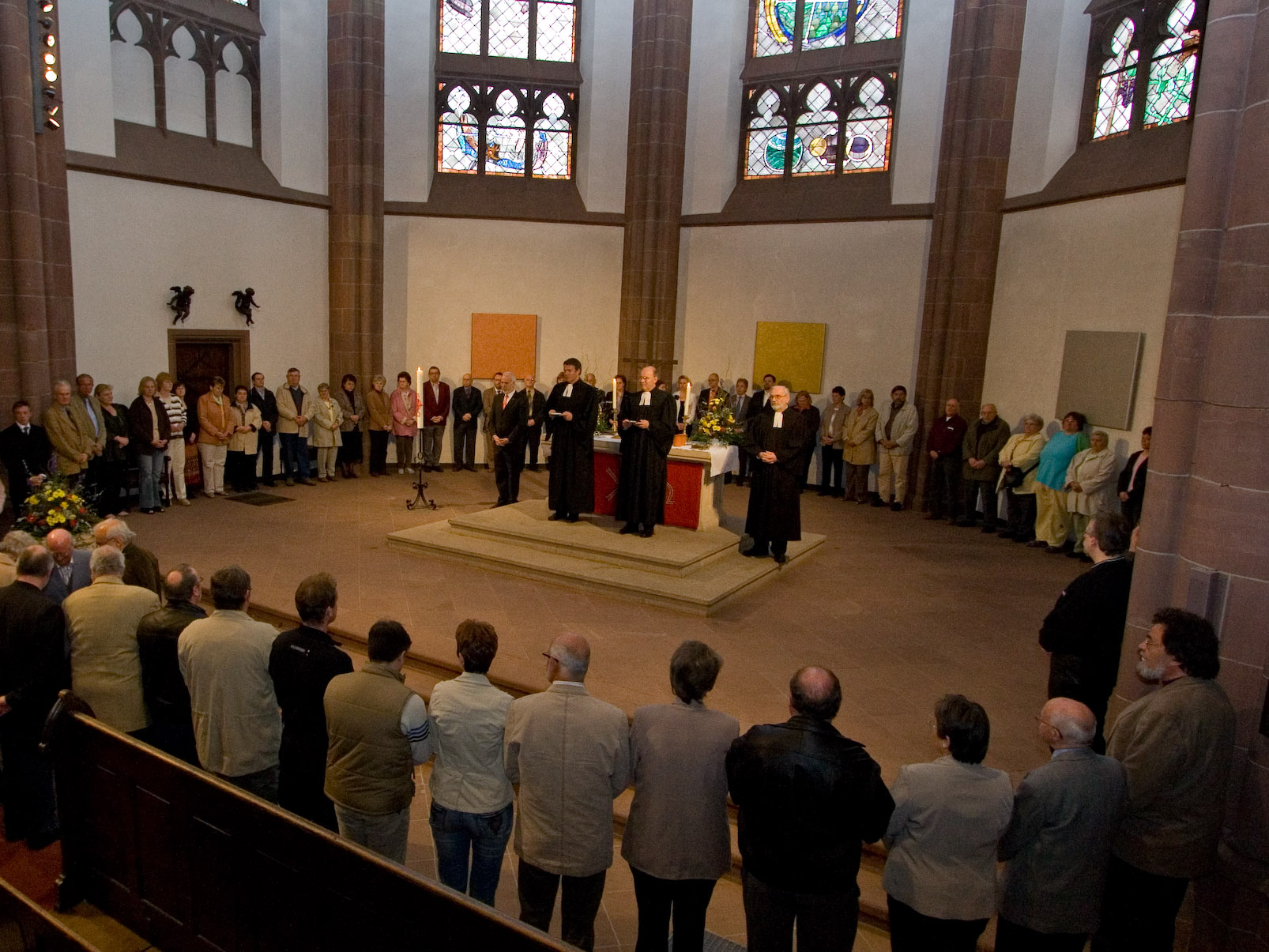
Protestant eucharist in Frankfurt

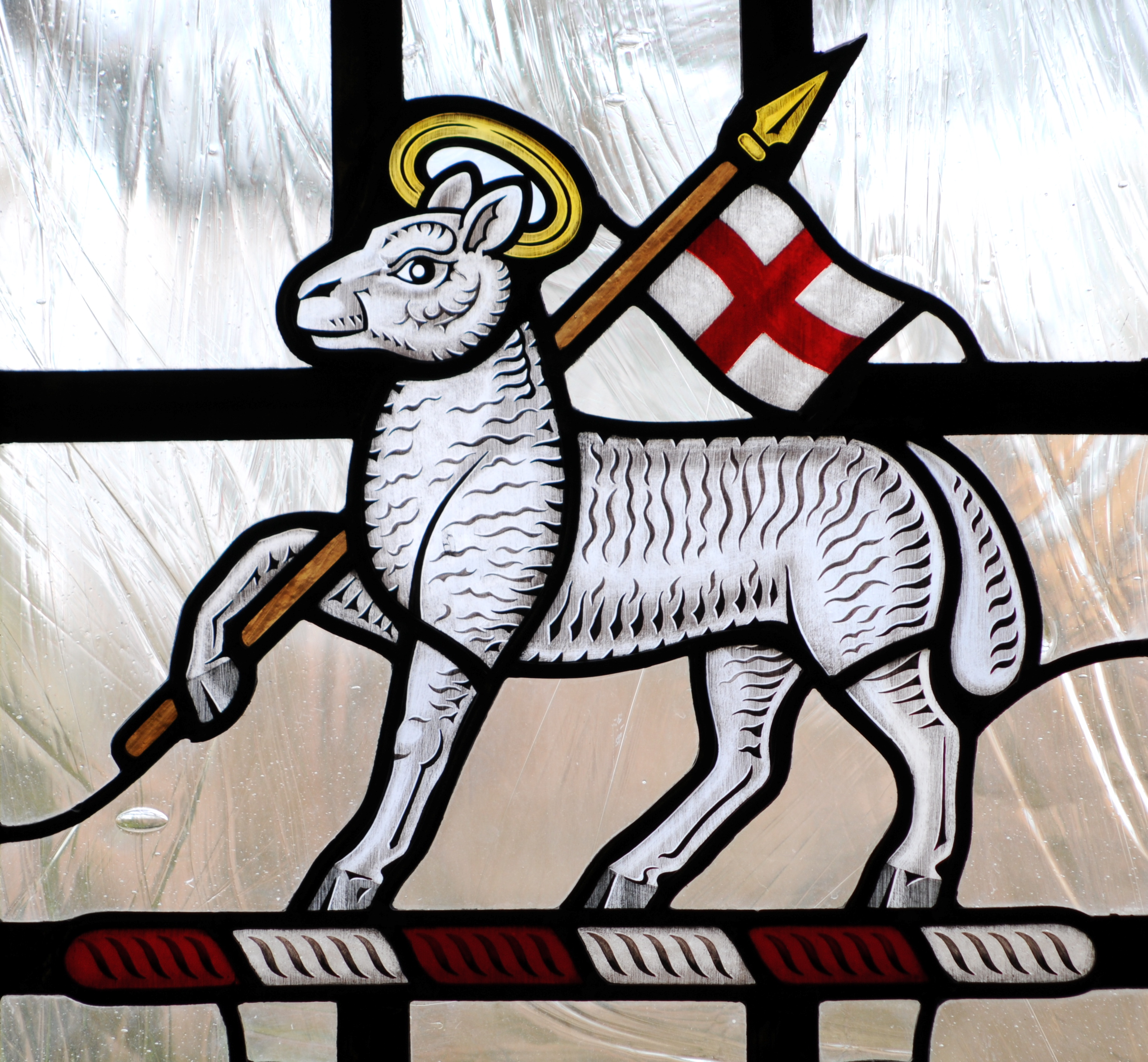
Paschal Lamb with the banner symbolising Christ's resurrection. Stained Glass, Anglican cathedral at Guildford, Surrey, England

== Bibliography ==
- Balthasar, Hans Urs, (1993) Mysterium Paschale: the mystery of Easter, Aidan Nichols OP (translation and introduction), Grand Rapids, Michigan, USA: W. B. Eerdmans, p. 297 ISBN 0-8028-0147-1
- Bonnard, Pierre Émile OP, (1988) Passover, in: Dictionary of Biblical Theology, Xavier Léon-Dufour (ed.), Third rev. edition, Pasay, Philippines - London: Paulines - Geoffrey Chapman, p. 406-409.
- Bouyer, Louis, (1951) The Paschal Mystery. Meditations on the Last Three Days of Holy Week, London.
- Bouyer L.,(1956) The spirit and forms of protestantism, A. V. Littledale (transl.), London - Glasgow: Collins, p. 285.
- Bouyer L. (1965), The Liturgy Revived. A Doctrinal Commentary of the Conciliar Constitution on the Liturgy. London: A Libra Book, 1965, p. 107.
- Cantalamessa, Raniero OFMCap, (1993) Introduction in Easter in the Early Church. An Anthology of Jewish and Early Christian Texts, Quigley SJ, J. T. Lienhard SJ (translators & editors), Collegville, Minnesota: The Liturgical Press, pp. 1–23, ISBN 0-8146-2164-3
- Füglister, Notker, (1969) Passover, in: Sacramentum Mundi, vol. 4, New York – London: Herder and Herder - Burns & Oates, pp. 352–357, ISBN 0 223 97630 X
- Gilson, Étienne, (1955, this edition 1985), History of Christian Philosophy in the Middle Ages, London: Sheed and Ward, p. 829, ISBN 0 72204114 4
- John Paul II, (1998) Apostolic letter On Keeping the Lord's Day Holy "Dies Domini"; see the text on-line: APOSTOLIC LETTER DIES DOMINI. Access date:2012-03-12.
- The Paschal mystery: ancient liturgies and patristic texts,(1969) A. Hamman (editor), Staten Island, NY: Alba House, p. 230
- Rahner K., Mystery, in: Sacramentum Mundi, vol. 4, New York – London: Herder and Herder - Burns & Oates, pp. 133–136, ISBN 0 223 97630 X
