= Sacraments of initiation =

Rites of initiation in Nicene Christianity

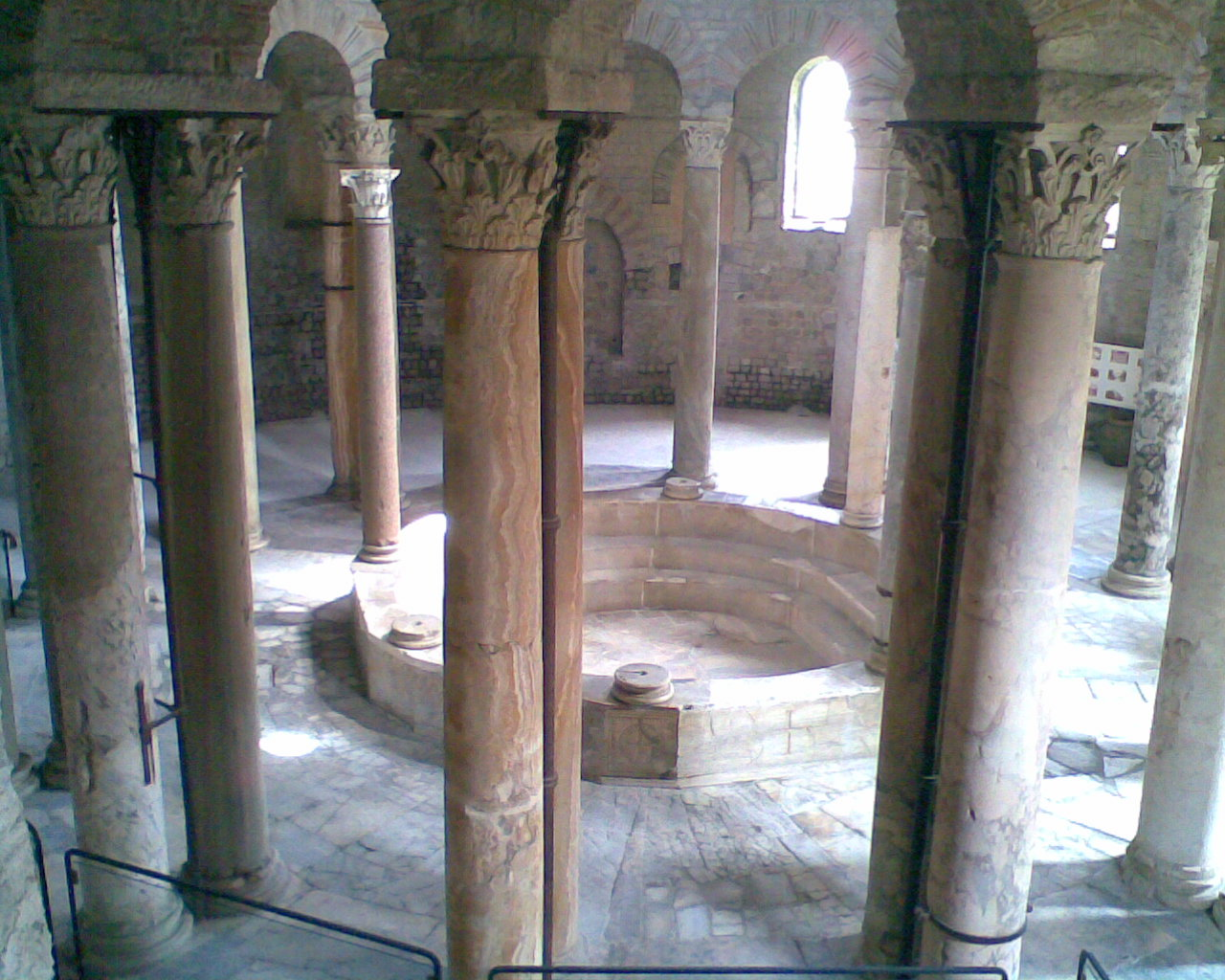
Early Christian baptistery (6th century, Nocera Superiore, Italy)

The sacraments of initiation (also called the "mysteries of initiation") are the three sacraments of baptism, confirmation, and eucharist (more specifically, the first communion) in Nicene Christianity. As such, they are distinguished from the sacraments of healing (anointing of the sick and sacrament of penance) and from the sacraments of service (marriage and ordination).

== Eastern and Western approaches ==
In Eastern Christianity all three sacraments are usually administered at the same time, even in the case of infants. In the Latin Church and other Western denominations, the rite of infant baptism was developed for use with babies. In these traditions the Eucharist and Confirmation are postponed until the child achieves the age of self-awareness. Adults are normally baptized after enrollment as a catechumen, either formally, as in the Latin Church, or more informally, as in some Eastern Catholic Churches. In his apostolic constitution Divinae consortium naturae on the sacrament of Confirmation, Pope Paul VI declared: "The sharing in the divine nature given to men through the grace of Christ bears a certain likeness to the origin, development, and nourishing of natural life. The faithful are born anew by Baptism, strengthened by the sacrament of Confirmation, and receive in the Eucharist the food of eternal life."

== Celebration ==
According to Catholic theology, the way the sacraments of initiation are celebrated is meant to bring a neophyte to experience and know, through visible sacramental signs and gestures, eternal life and grace Jesus has brought into this world. They are always accompanied by the Word of God. Particular focus is placed on the paschal mystery of Christ's death and resurrection. The privileged time of celebrating them is Easter, and by the 4th century it was accepted as the normal time of administering them, although it was also allowed on Pentecost.

== See also ==
- Sacraments of the Catholic Church
- Thomas Aquinas and the Sacraments

== Bibliography ==
- Raniero Cantalamessa OFMCap, (1993) Introduction, in: Easter in the Early Church. An Anthology of Jewish and Early Christian Texts, J.M. Quigley SJ, J.T. Lienhard SJ (translators & editors), Collegville, Minnesota: The Liturgical Press, pp. 1–23, ISBN 0-8146-2164-3
- Fisher, J.D.C., (1970) Christian initiation. The Reformation period. Some early reformed rites of Baptism and Confirmation and other contemporary Documents, London: SPCK, p. 273.
- Kenan B. Osborne, OFM, (1987), The Christian Sacraments of Initiation. Baptism, Confirmation, Eucharist, New York-Mahwah: Paulist Press, ISBN 0-8091-2886-1
- Liam G. Walsh OP, (1988) The Sacraments of Christian Initiation. Baptism, Confirmation, Eucharist. London: Geoffrey Chapman, ISBN 0-225-66499-2, p. 317.
- Edward Yarnold SJ, (1971) The awe inspiring rites of initiation. Baptismal homilies of the fourth century, Slough: St. Paul Publications, p. 292 ISBN 0-85439-082-0
