= Bunnell Incorporated =

Medical equipment company

- Type: Private
- Industry: Electromedical and Electrotherapeutic Apparatus
- Founded: 1980
- Founder: Bert Bunnell
- Headquarters: Salt Lake City, United States
- Area served: United States, Canada, Europe, Australia, Malaysia, Uruguay, and Trinidad and Tobago.
- Key people: J. Bert Bunnell, Thomas Kessler, Ila Jean Larson
- Products: Medical Ventilators
- Owner: Bert Bunnell
- Number of employees: 20 to 50
- Website: www.bunl.com

Bunnell Incorporated is a medical equipment company founded in 1980. The first and most famous product by Bunnell is the Life Pulse Ventilator, the first high-frequency ventilator approved by the U.S. Food and Drug Administration (FDA) for clinical use in 1988.

== History ==
Bunnell Incorporated was established in 1980 with the help of the University of Utah's Innovation Center, which is a project funded by the National Science Foundation. In 1982, the company began clinical trials for the Life Pulse Ventilator at five key medical centers in Utah, Arizona, Minnesota, Pennsylvania, and Florida.

In 1985, the company treated almost 100 infants, then submitted "12 copies of a nearly thousand-page application to the FDA for approval." The application was rejected and continued to be rejected for three years, the company was under a $2 million debt. On June 30, 1988, the FDA approval was granted.
