= Pneumopericardium =

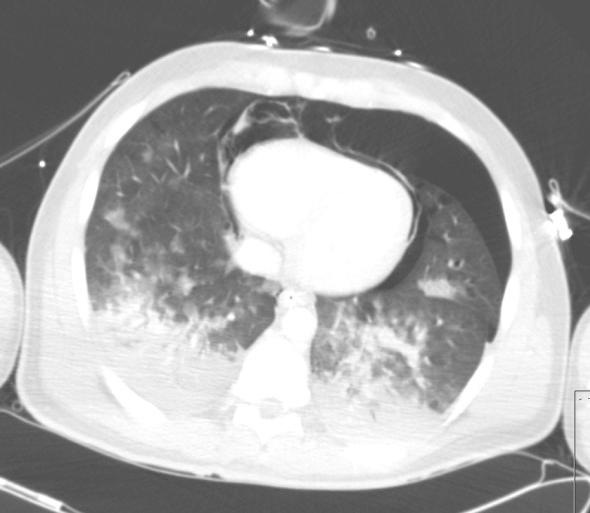
- CT scan showing pneumopericardium with pneumomediastinum, pneumothorax, hemothorax, and pulmonary contusion after severe chest trauma
- Specialty: Emergency medicine

Pneumopericardium is a medical condition where air enters the pericardial cavity. This condition has been recognized in preterm neonates, in which it is associated with severe lung pathology, after vigorous resuscitation, or in the presence of assisted ventilation. This is a serious complication, which if untreated may lead to cardiac tamponade and death. Pneumomediastinum, which is the presence of air in the mediastinum, may mimic and also coexist with pneumopericardium.

It can be congenital, or introduced by a wound.

== Presentation ==
The symptomatic patient may present with dyspnea, cyanosis, chest pain, pulsus paradoxus, bradycardia or tachycardia.

== Pathophysiology ==
The mechanism responsible for pneumopericardium is the ‘Macklin effect’ – There is initially an increased pressure gradient between the alveoli and the interstitial space. Increased pressure leads to alveolar rupture, resulting in air getting through to the pericapillary interstitial pulmonary space. This space is continuous with the peribronchial and pulmonary perivascular sheaths. From here, the air tracks to the hilum of the lung and then to the mediastinum. In case of a pericardial tear, this air enters the pericardial cavity and pneumopericardium develops. The condition may remain asymptomatic or may progress to life-threatening conditions like tension pneumopericardium or cardiac tamponade.

== Diagnosis ==
On physical examination, the patient may have the classic “Beck’s triad” – hypotension, raised JVP and distant heart sounds, when complicated by cardiac tamponade. Extension of the mediastinal air to the subcutaneous tissues via the fascial planes may lead to subcutaneous emphysema. When air and fluid mix together in the pericardial sac, a tinkling sound superimposed over a succussion splash is heard. This is known as a “Bruit de Moulin”, which is French for “Mill–wheel” murmur. Air between the anterior parietal pericardium and the thoracic cage may also give rise to the “Hamman’s Sign” – which is a crunching sound typically heard on auscultation of the chest, but may sometimes be heard even with the unaided ear.

== See also ==
- Hamman's sign
