= Pulmonary interstitial emphysema =

Collection of air outside of the normal air space of the pulmonary alveoli

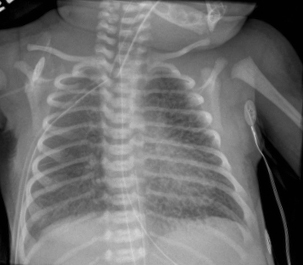
- Chest radiography showing severe pulmonary interstitial emphysema
- Specialty: Pediatrics

Pulmonary interstitial emphysema (PIE) is a collection of air outside of the normal air space of the pulmonary alveoli, found instead inside the connective tissue of the peribronchovascular sheaths, interlobular septa, and visceral pleura. (This supportive tissue is called the pulmonary interstitium.) This collection of air develops as a result of alveolar and terminal bronchiolar rupture. Pulmonary interstitial emphysema is more frequent in premature infants who require mechanical ventilation for severe lung disease. Infants with pulmonary interstitial emphysema are typically recommended for admission to a neonatal intensive care unit.

== Cause ==
Pulmonary interstitial emphysema is a concern in any of the following:

- Prematurity
- Infant respiratory distress syndrome (IRDS)
- Meconium aspiration syndrome (MAS)
- Amniotic fluid aspiration
- Sepsis
- Infections
- Mechanical ventilation

== Pathophysiology ==
Pulmonary interstitial emphysema is created when air bursts or ruptures through tissue from the alveoli and bronchioles into the perivascular tissue of the lung.

== Diagnosis ==
A chest X ray may show a "salt and pepper" appearance due to the linear lucencies that are present.

== Treatment ==
Different treatments have been used to manage pulmonary interstitial emphysema with variable success. Admission/transfer to a neonatal intensive care unit (NICU) is common and expected for patients with PIE. Treatments include:

- Lateral decubitus position with the affected side down
- High-frequency ventilation
- Lobectomy
- Selective Main Bronchial Intubation and Occlusion

== Prognosis ==
Pulmonary interstitial emphysema often resolves gradually and may take 2–3 weeks. For longer durations of PIE the length of time of mechanical ventilation needed may increase and the incidence of bronchopulmonary dysplasia becomes higher. Some infants may develop chronic lobar emphysema, which may require surgical lobectomies.

== Epidemiology ==
=== United States ===
The prevalence of pulmonary interstitial emphysema widely varies with the population studied. In a 1987 study 3% of infants admitted to the neonatal intensive care unit (NICU) developed pulmonary interstitial emphysema.

=== International ===
Studies reflecting international frequency demonstrated that 2-3% of all infants in NICUs develop pulmonary interstitial emphysema. When limiting the population studied to premature infants, this frequency increases to 20-30%, with the highest frequencies occurring in infants weighing fewer than 1000 g.

== See also ==
- Bronchopulmonary dysplasia
