= Salvation history =

Historical and theological approach

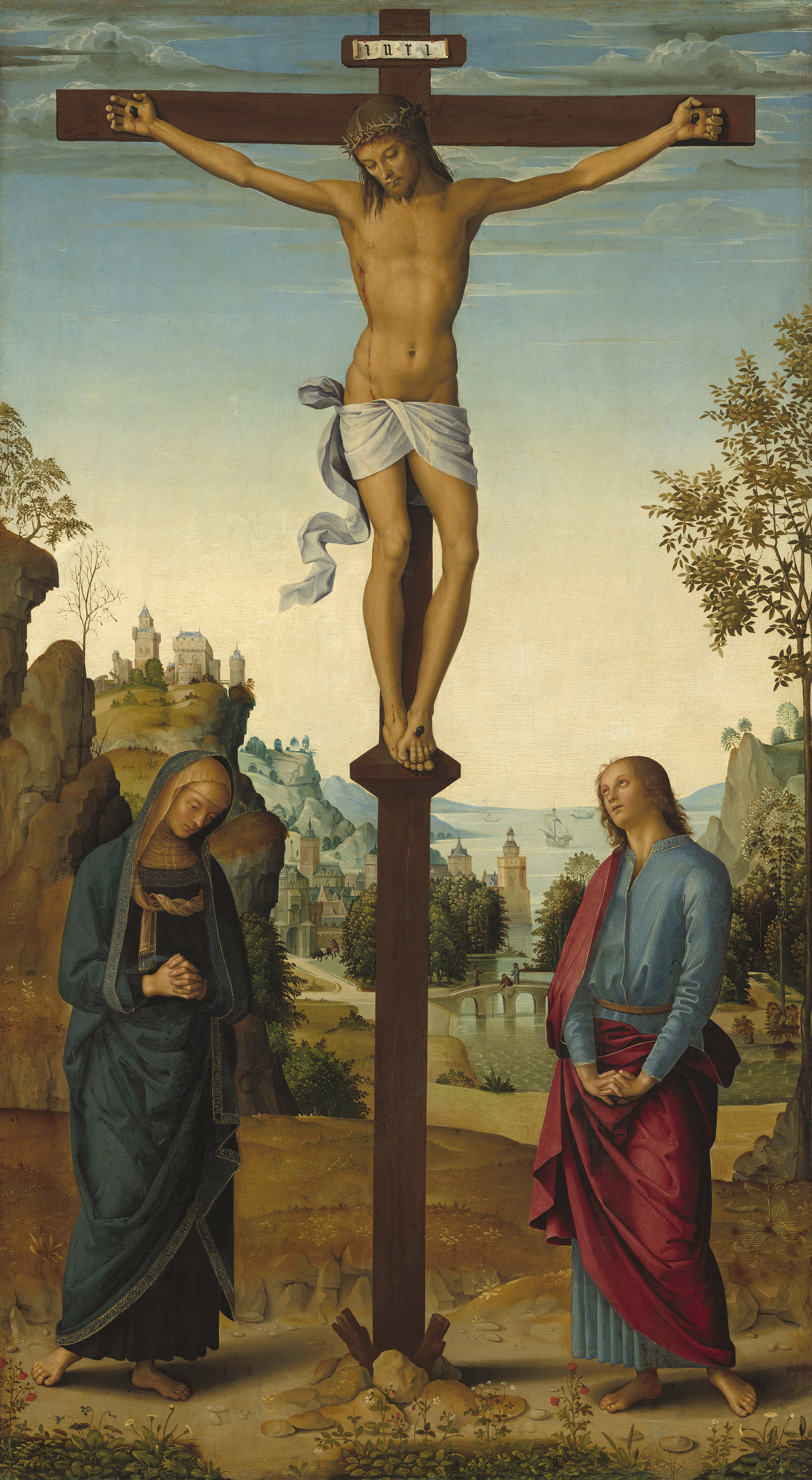
Pietro Perugino's depiction of the Crucifixion as Stabat Mater, 1482. The crucifixion, together with the resurrection of Jesus, represents the climax of Salvation History in Christian faith

Salvation history (German: Heilsgeschichte) seeks to understand the personal redemptive activity of God within human history in order to effect God's eternal saving intentions.

== In the Bible ==
=== Old Testament ===
This approach to history is found in parts of the Old Testament written around the sixth century BC, such as Deutero-Isaiah and some of the Psalms. In Deutero-Isaiah, for example, Yahweh is portrayed as causing the fall of the Neo-Babylonian Empire at the hands of Cyrus the Great and the Persians, with the aim of restoring his exiled people to their land.

=== Pauline epistles ===
The salvation history approach was adopted and deployed by Christians, beginning with Paul in his epistles. He taught a dialectical theology wherein believers were caught between the "already" of Christ's death and resurrection, and the "not yet" of the coming Parousia (or Christ's return to Earth at the end of human history). He sought to explain the Christ's mystery through the lens of the history of the Hebrew scriptures, for example, by drawing parallels and contrasts between Adam's disobedience and Christ's faithfulness on the cross.

== In Christian theology ==
In the context of Christian theology, this approach reads the books of the Bible as a continuous history. It understands events such as the fall at the beginning of history (Book of Genesis), the covenants established between God and Noah, Abraham, and Moses, the establishment of the Davidic dynasty in the holy city of Jerusalem, the prophets, as moments in the history of humankind and its relationship to God, namely, as necessary events preparing for the salvation of all by Christ's crucifixion and resurrection. The Second Vatican Council's Dogmatic Constitution on Divine Revelation, Dei verbum characterises God's actions in the Old Testament period as "carefully planning and preparing the salvation of the whole human race".

== In Islamic theology ==
Salvation history also plays a role in Islamic theology, such as in the narrative of the Jahiliyyah: a term for a morally corrupt era and social order that prevailed in pre-Islamic Arabia prior to the mission of Muhammad. A process in the Quran and later Islamic literature where pre-Islamic Christian figures are re-narrated as Muslim or proto-Islamic precursors to Muhammad's mission has also been understood in the framework of salvation history. Salvation history also occurs in Quranic narratives that heed the audience to consider the fate of earlier nations, destroyed by God for disobeying the messengers sent to them.

== See also ==
- Apocalypse
- Christian pacifism
- Christian Zionism
- Dispensationalism
- Eschatology
