= Esophageal rupture =

Tearing of the wall of the esophagus

Boerhaave syndrome
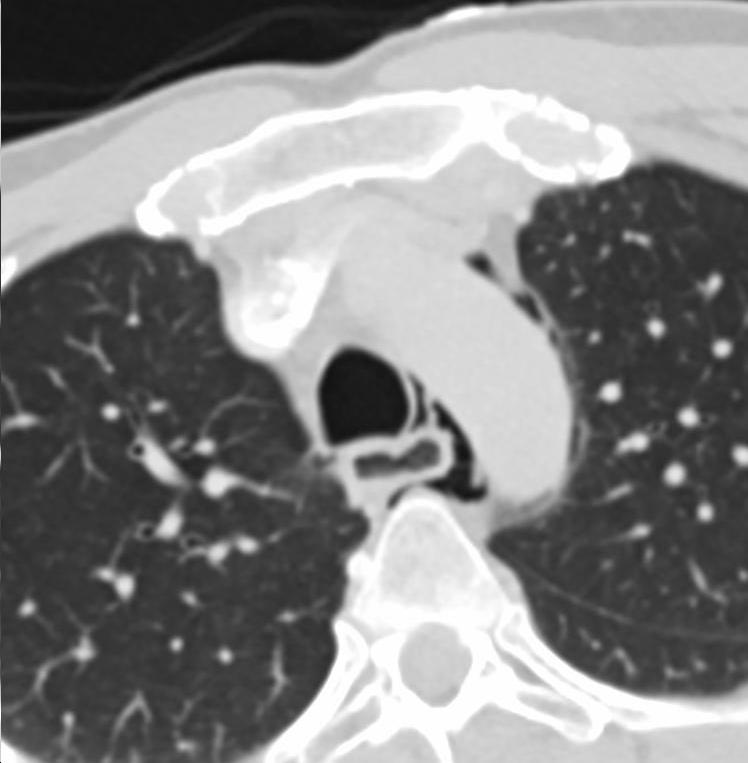
- Axial CT image through the upper chest showing extraluminal air (Pneumomediastinum) surrounding the trachea and esophagus
- Specialty: Gastroenterology; General surgery Emergency medicine

Esophageal rupture, also known as Boerhaave syndrome, is a rupture of the esophageal wall. Iatrogenic causes account for approximately 56% of esophageal perforations, usually due to medical instrumentation such as an endoscopy or paraesophageal surgery. The 10% of esophageal perforations caused specifically by vomiting are termed Boerhaave syndrome.

Spontaneous perforation of the esophagus is most commonly a full-thickness tear in the esophageal wall due to a sudden increase in intraesophageal pressure combined with relatively negative intrathoracic pressure caused by straining or vomiting (effort rupture of the esophagus or Boerhaave syndrome). Other causes of spontaneous perforation include caustic ingestion, pill esophagitis, Barrett's esophagus, infectious ulcers in patients with AIDS, and following dilation of esophageal strictures.

In most cases of Boerhaave syndrome, the tear occurs at the left postero-lateral aspect of the distal esophagus and extends for several centimeters. The condition is associated with high morbidity and mortality and is fatal without treatment. The occasionally nonspecific nature of the symptoms may contribute to a delay in diagnosis and a poor outcome. Spontaneous effort rupture of the cervical esophagus, leading to localized cervical perforation, may be more common than previously recognized and has a generally benign course. Pre-existing esophageal disease is not a prerequisite for esophageal perforation, but it contributes to increased mortality.

This condition was first documented by the 18th-century physician Herman Boerhaave, after whom it is named. A related condition is Mallory-Weiss syndrome which is only a mucosal tear. A common site of iatrogenic perforation is the cervical esophagus just above the upper sphincter, whereas spontaneous rupture as seen in Boerhaave syndrome perforation commonly occurs in the lower third of the esophagus.

== Signs and symptoms ==
The classic history of esophageal rupture is one of severe retching and vomiting followed by excruciating retrosternal chest and upper abdominal pain. Odynophagia, tachypnea, dyspnea, cyanosis, fever, and shock develop rapidly thereafter.

Physical examination is usually not helpful, particularly early in the course. Subcutaneous emphysema is an important diagnostic finding but is not very sensitive, being present in only 9 of 34 patients (27 percent) in one series. A pleural effusion may also be detected.

Mackler's triad includes chest pain, vomiting, and subcutaneous emphysema, and while it is a classical presentation, it is only present in 14% of people.

Pain can occasionally radiate to the left shoulder, causing physicians to confuse an esophageal perforation with a myocardial infarction.

It may also be audibly recognized as Hamman's sign.

== Pathophysiology ==
Esophageal rupture, in Boerhaave syndrome, is thought to be the result of a sudden rise in internal esophageal pressure produced during vomiting, as a result of neuromuscular incoordination causing failure of the cricopharyngeus muscle (a sphincter within the pharynx) to relax. As the intra-oesophageal pressure increases, the bolus within the oesophagus has nowhere to go superiorly (as the cricopharyngeus fails to relax) which causes the oesophagus to rupture. The syndrome is commonly associated with the consumption of excessive food and/or alcohol, as well as eating disorders such as bulimia.

The most common anatomical location of the tear in Boerhaave syndrome is at left posterolateral wall of the lower third of the esophagus, 2–3 cm before the stomach.

Currently, the most common cause of esophageal perforation is iatrogenic. However, iatrogenic perforations, while still constituting a serious medical condition, are easier to treat and less prone to complications, particularly mediastinitis and sepsis. This is because they usually do not involve contamination of the mediastinum with gastric contents.

== Diagnosis ==
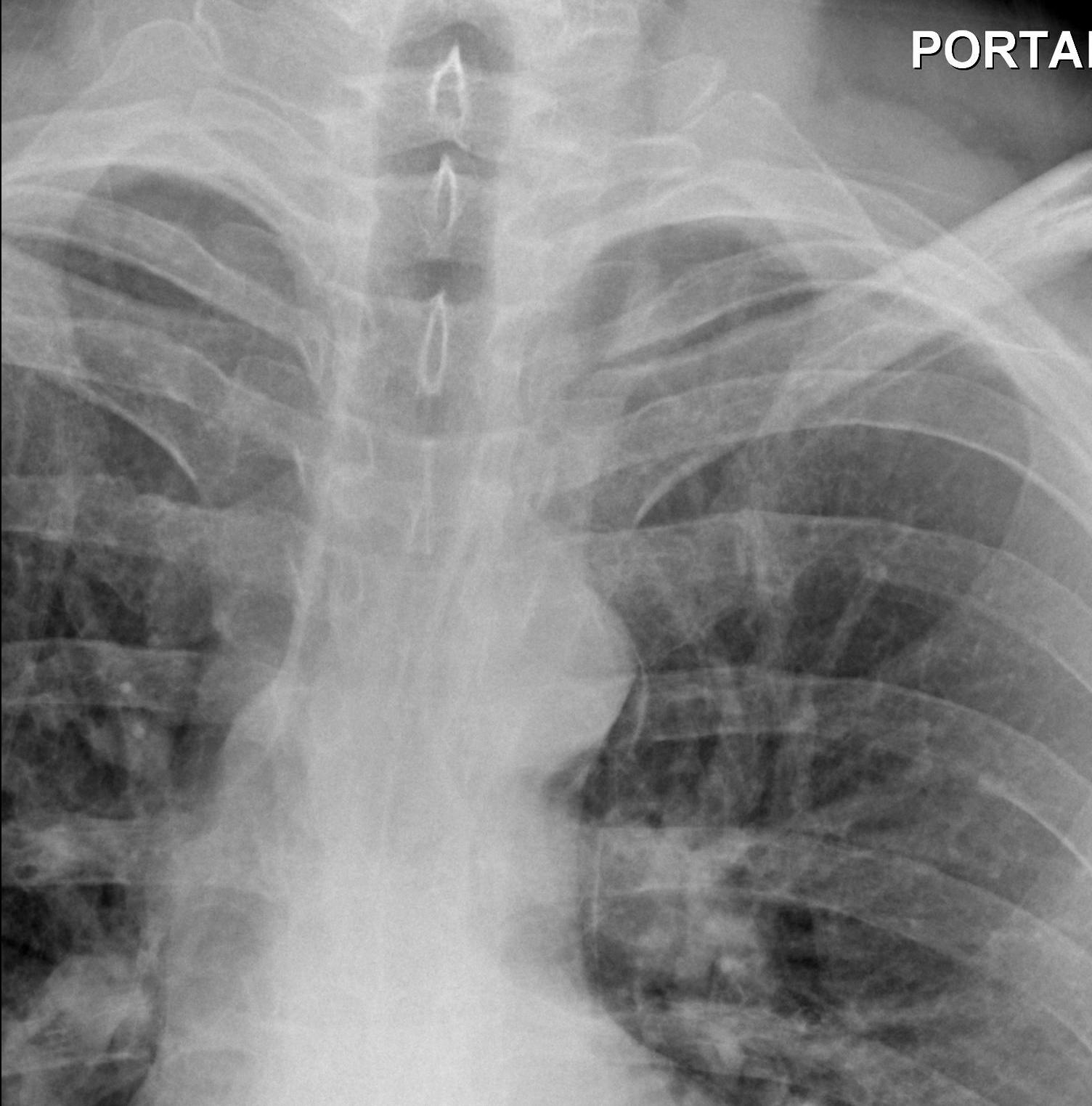
Upright chest radiography showing mediastinal air adjacent to the aorta and tracking cephalad adjacent to the left common carotid artery. This patient presented to the emergency department with severe chest pain after eating.

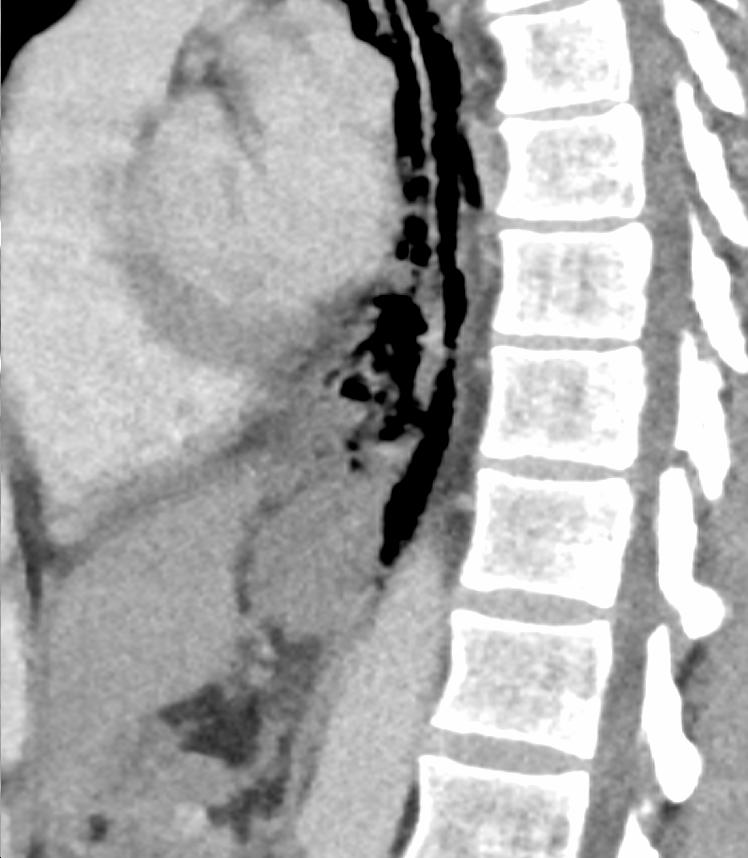
Sagittal reformatted CT image showing discontinutity in the wall of the posterolateral aspect of the distal esophagus

The diagnosis of Boerhaave syndrome is suggested on the plain chest radiography and confirmed by chest CT scan. The initial plain chest radiograph is almost always abnormal in patients with Boerhaave syndrome and usually reveals mediastinal or free peritoneal air as the initial radiologic manifestation. With cervical esophageal perforations, plain films of the neck show air in the soft tissues of the prevertebral space.

Hours to days later, pleural effusion(s) with or without pneumothorax, widened mediastinum, and subcutaneous emphysema is typically seen. CT scan may show esophageal wall edema and thickening, extraesophageal air, periesophageal fluid with or without gas bubbles, mediastinal widening, and air and fluid in the pleural spaces, retroperitoneum or lesser sac.

The diagnosis of esophageal perforation could also be confirmed by water-soluble contrast esophagram (Gastrografin), which reveals the location and extent of extravasation of contrast material. Although barium is superior in demonstrating small perforations, the spillage of barium sulfate into the mediastinal and pleural cavities can cause an inflammatory response and subsequent fibrosis and is therefore not used as the primary diagnostic study. If, however, the water-soluble study is negative, a barium study should be performed for better definition.

Endoscopy has no role in the diagnosis of spontaneous esophageal perforation. Both the endoscope and insufflation of air can extend the perforation and introduce air into the mediastinum.

Patients may also have a pleural effusion high in amylase (from saliva), low pH, and may contain particles of food.

=== Differential diagnosis ===
Common misdiagnoses include myocardial infarction, pancreatitis, lung abscess, pericarditis, and spontaneous pneumothorax. If esophageal perforation is suspected, even in the absence of physical findings, chest xray, water soluble contrast radiographic studies of the esophagus and a CT scan should be promptly obtained. In most cases, non-operative management is administered based on radiological evidence contained in mediastinal collection.

== Treatment ==
With the exception of a few case reports describing survival without surgery, the mortality of untreated Boerhaave syndrome is 100%. With surgical intervention, the mortality rate decreases to 30%. Its treatment includes immediate antibiotic therapy to prevent mediastinitis and sepsis, surgical repair of the perforation, and if there is significant fluid loss it should be replaced with IV fluid therapy since oral rehydration is not possible. Even with early surgical intervention (within 24 hours) the risk of death is 25%.
