= Hamman's sign =

Abnormal crunching sound heard from the chest area

- Differential diagnosis: pneumomediastinum

Hamman's sign (rarely, Hammond's sign or Hammond's crunch) is a medical sign consisting of a crunching, rasping sound, synchronous with the heartbeat, heard over the precordium in spontaneous mediastinal emphysema. It is thought to result from the heart beating against air-filled tissues.

It is named after Johns Hopkins clinician Louis Hamman, M.D.

This sound is heard best over the left lateral position. It has been described as a series of precordial crackles that correlate with the heart beat rather than respiration.

== Causes ==
Hamman's crunch is caused by pneumomediastinum or pneumopericardium, and is associated with tracheobronchial injury due to trauma, medical procedures (e.g., bronchoscopy) or rupture of a proximal pulmonary bleb. It can be seen with Boerhaave syndrome.

== See also ==
- Hamman's syndrome
