= Louis Hamman =

American physician (1877–1946)

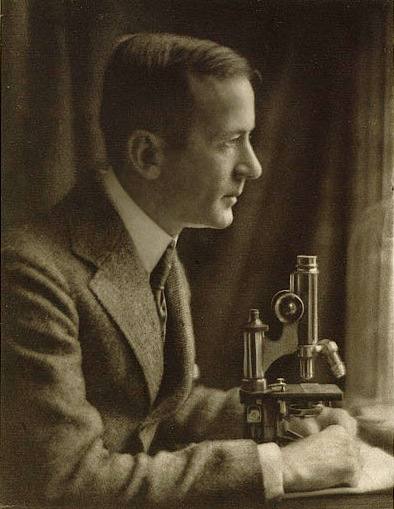
- Born: Louis Virgil Hamman; December 21, 1877; Baltimore, Maryland, U.S.
- Died: April 28, 1946 (aged 68); Baltimore, Maryland, U.S.
- Education: Rock Hill College (BS); Johns Hopkins University School of Medicine (MD)
- Spouses: Mary Brereton Sharretts (m. 1906; died 1940) Marian Campbell Bond (m. 1943)
- Children: 3

Louis Virgil Hamman (December 21, 1877 – April 28, 1946) was an American physician who was recognized as one of the great clinicians in his time.

== Early life ==
Louis Virgil Hamman was born on December 21, 1877, in Baltimore, Maryland, to Agatha (née Haseneyer) and John A. Hamman. Hamman graduated from Calvert Hall College High School. He then graduated with a Bachelor of Science from Rock Hill College in 1895. He graduated with an M.D. from Johns Hopkins University School of Medicine in 1901.

== Career ==
Hamman interned at New York Hospital from 1901 to 1902 and served as a resident physician until 1903. Hamman returned in 1903 to his alma mater to practice medicine. Hamman served as an assistant in medicine at Johns Hopkins School of Medicine from 1903 to 1906. He then served as instructor from 1906 to 1908 and associate in medicine from 1908 to 1915. He was associate professor of clinical medicine from 1915 to 1932. In 1932, he was appointed associate professor of medicine. In 1933, he became head of the new Phipps Tuberculosis Clinic.

Hamman was assistant visiting physician at Johns Hopkins Hospital from 1908 to 1928. He served as visiting physician from 1928 to his death.

Hamman was elected vice president of the Association of American Physicians in 1939. He was a member of Phi Beta Kappa and served as corresponding secretary of the International Anti-Tuberculosis Society.

== Personal life ==
Hamman married Mary Brereton Sharretts in 1906. She died in 1940. He married Marian Campbell Bond in February 1943. He had one son and two daughters, Louis Jr., Mrs. Kenneth Sharretts and Mrs. Franklin Ray.

Hamman died on April 28, 1946, at Johns Hopkins Hospital in Baltimore.

== Legacy ==
Conditions which carry his name: Hamman's sign, Hamman's syndrome and Hamman-Rich syndrome.
