= Pneumomediastinum =

Abnormal presence of gas in the thorax

- Other names: Mediastinal emphysema
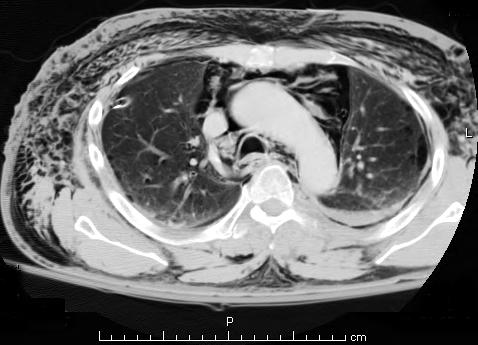
- A CT scan showing air in the mediastinum

Pneumomediastinum (from Greek pneuma – "air", also known as mediastinal emphysema) is pneumatosis (abnormal presence of air or other gas) in the mediastinum, the central part of the chest cavity. First described in 1819 by René Laennec, the condition can result from physical trauma or other situations that lead to air escaping from the lungs, airways, or bowel into the chest cavity. In underwater divers it is usually the result of pulmonary barotrauma.

== Signs and symptoms ==
The main symptom is usually severe central chest pain. Other symptoms include laboured breathing, voice distortion (as with helium) and subcutaneous emphysema, specifically affecting the face, neck, and chest. Pneumomediastinum can also be characterized by the shortness of breath that is typical of a respiratory system problem. It is often recognized on auscultation by a "crunching" sound timed with the cardiac cycle (Hamman's crunch). Pneumomediastinum may also present with symptoms mimicking cardiac tamponade as a result of the increased intrapulmonary pressure on venous flow to the heart.

== Cause ==
It is most commonly caused by:

- Esophageal rupture, for example in Boerhaave syndrome
- Asthma, crack cocaine use or other conditions leading to alveolar rupture
- Bowel rupture, where air in the abdominal cavity tracts up into the chest.

It has also been associated with:

- Mycoplasma pneumoniae pneumonia
- obesity

It can be induced to assist thoracoscopic surgery.

It can be caused by a pulmonary barotrauma induced by a person moving from a higher to a lower pressure environment, such as when a scuba or surface-supplied diver, a free-diver after lung-packing, or an airplane passenger ascends. In the case of scuba and surface supplied divers, the diver breathes gas at ambient pressure, and if this is not able to escape freely during ascent, the pressure difference will cause it to expand, and may rupture the lung tissues (pulmonary barotrauma), and escape to a variety of places, one of which can be the mediastinum. A diver with symptoms of mediastinal emphysema may also have any combination of arterial gas embolism, pneumothorax and subcutaneous or pulmonary interstitial emphysema. Factors which may prevent free escape of the compressed breathing gas include holding the breath or respiratory obstructions such as cysts, mucus plugs, or scar tissue.

In rare cases, pneumomediastinum may also arise as a result of blunt chest trauma (e.g. car accidents, fights, over pressure of breathing apparatus), while still evolving in the same fashion as the spontaneous form.

Pneumomediastinum is most commonly seen in otherwise healthy young male patients and may not be prefaced by a relevant medical history of similar ailments.

== Diagnosis ==
Pneumomediastinum is uncommon and occurs when air leaks into the mediastinum. The diagnosis can be confirmed via chest X-ray showing a radiolucent outline around the heart and mediastinum or via CT scanning of the thorax.

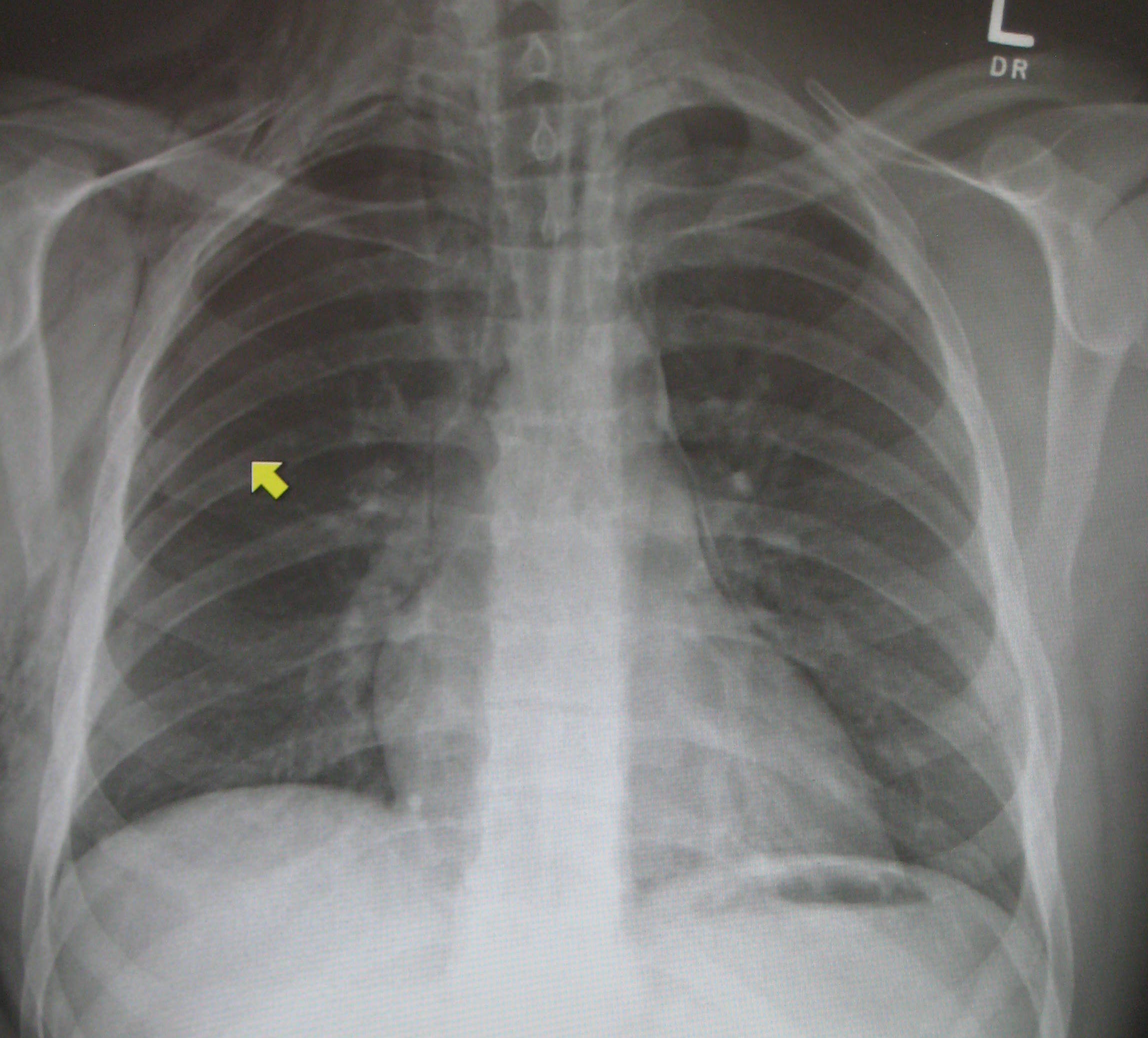
Pneumomediastinum and right sided pneumothorax post first rib fracture in a mountain biking accident.

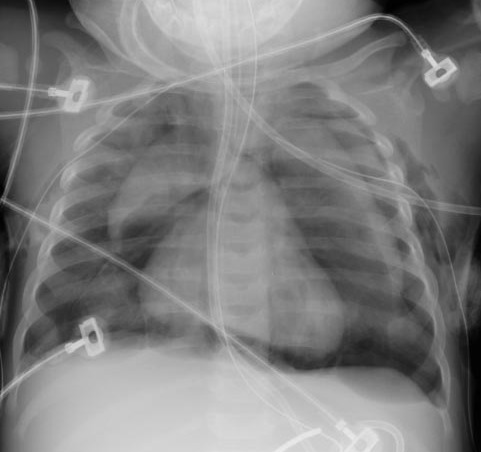
Pneumomediastinum with angel wing sign

Pneumomediastinum as seen on ultrasound

== Treatment ==
The tissues in the mediastinum will slowly resorb the air in the cavity so most pneumomediastinums are treated conservatively. Breathing high flow oxygen will increase the absorption of the air. If the air is under pressure and compressing the heart, a needle may be inserted into the cavity, releasing the air. Surgery may be needed to repair the hole in the trachea, esophagus or bowel.

If there is lung collapse, it is imperative the affected individual lies on the side of the collapse. Although painful, this allows full inflation of the unaffected lung.
