= Adalbert Hamman =

French priest and translator (1910–2000)

Adalbert-Gautier Hamman (1910 – 10 July 2000) was a French Franciscan priest. His main achievement was the publication of nearly one hundred translations of patristic texts in French, in the collection known as Les Pères dans la foi, although a complete bibliographical description would extend much further. His liturgical and social writings contributed to the mental climate of the second Vatican Council.

== Selected works ==
- Hamman, Adalbert (ed.). Patrologiae Cursus Completus, Series Latina, Supplementum. Paris: Garnier. (book series). A supplement to Jacques Paul Migne's magnum opus.
- Les Pères dans la foi [The Fathers in Faith] (book series).
- Hamman, Adalbert-G. (1969). The paschal mystery : ancient liturgies and patristic texts. Staten Island, New York: Alba House.
