= ICU quality and management tools =

Intensive Care Unit (ICU) quality and management tools refer to a range of strategies, technologies, and practices aimed at improving patient outcomes, operational efficiency, and safety within the Intensive Care Unit (ICU).

== ICU quality tools ==
Quality tools include:

- Medical guidelines, including checklists (items rated as yes/no/not applicable)
- Templates for goal setting or structured communication (a more open format than checklists, templates provide the opportunity to add free text responses with items as prompts)
- Care bundles, including ABCDE(F) bundle (Assess, prevent and manage pain, Both spontaneous awakening trials and spontaneous breathing trials, Choice of analgesia and sedation, Delirium assessment, prevention and management, Early mobility and exercise, Family engagement and empowerment)

Medical scoring systems can be used to describe ICU populations and explain their different outcomes. Examples include:

- APACHE II
- SAPS II
- SAPS III
- Mortality Probability Model (MPM)

Physical tools include:

- Monitoring (medicine), which may provide data for analysis of ICU performance.

== ICU management tools ==
=== Severity assessment tools ===
Examples of severity assessment tools:

- Pneumonia severity index (PSI) or PORT score)
- CURB65 score
- CRB65 score
- American Thoracic Society (ATS) 2001 criteria
- Infectious Disease Society of America/ATS (IDSA/ATS) 2007 criteria
- Panic Disorder Screener (PADIS) guidelines

=== Risk stratification tools ===
Risk stratification tools examples:

- Early warning score such as the Modified Early Warning Score (MEWS), to predict ICU readmission, and the Pediatric early warning signs (PEWS) score
- Minimizing ICU Readmission (MIR) score, to predict patient death or ICU readmission.
- Sabadell score, which predicts hospital mortality after ICU discharge.
- Stability and Workload Index for Transfer (SWIFT) score and the Frost nomogram, to predict ICU readmission.

== See also ==
- APACHE II
- SAPS III
- Intensive care medicine
- Intensive care unit
