= List of medical abbreviations: S =

Abbreviation	Meaning
s̅	without (s with an overbar) (from Latin sine)
S	sacrum
S_{x}	symptoms surgery (though deemed by some as inappropriate)
S_{1}	first heart sound
S_{2}	second heart sound
S_{3}	third heart sound
S_{4}	fourth heart sound
S&O	salpingo-oophorectomy
Sb	Scholar batch
SAAG	serum–ascites albumin gradient
SAB	staphylococcal bacteremia spontaneous abortion (that is, miscarriage)
SAD	seasonal affective disorder subacromial decompression
SAH	subarachnoid hemorrhage
SAM	systolic anterior motion of the mitral valve Severe acute malnutrition
SAN	sinoatrial node
SaO_{2}	arterial oxygen saturation
SAPS II	simplified acute physiology score
SAPS III	simplified acute physiology score
SAR	seasonal allergic rhinitis sub-acute rehabilitation facility
Sarc	sarcoidosis
SARS	severe acute respiratory syndrome
SB	small bowel (see small intestine)
SBE	subacute bacterial endocarditis
SBFT	small bowel follow through
SBMA	spinal and bulbar muscular atrophy
SBO	small bowel obstruction
SBP	systolic blood pressure spontaneous bacterial peritonitis
SBR	Serum Bilirubin
SBRT	split beam radiation therapy
SC	Spinal Cord or subcutaneous (from Latin subcutis)
SCA	spinocerebellar ataxia
SCAT	sex cord tumor with annular tubes
SCC	squamous cell carcinoma
SCD	sequential compression device sickle-cell disease sudden cardiac death
SCI	spinal cord injury
SCID	severe combined immunodeficiency
SCIWORA	spinal cord injury without radiographic abnormality
SCLC	small cell lung cancer
SCN	severe congenital neutropenia sickle cell nephropathy superior cluneal nerves suprachiasmatic nucleus
scope	microscope or endoscope
SCT	sacrococcygeal tumor
SCZ	schizophrenia
S.D.	subdermal
SD σ	standard deviation
SDH	subdural hematoma
SDTI	suspected deep tissue injury
SE	standard error side effect
Sed	sedimentation (rate) (see erythrocyte sedimentation rate)
SEE	syphilis elimination effort
Segs	segmented cells
SEM	standard error of the mean systolic ejection murmur (see heart murmur)
SERM	selective estrogen receptor modulator
SERT	serotonin transporter
SFA	superficial femoral artery serum folic acid
SGA	small for gestational age
SG cath	Swan–Ganz catheter (see pulmonary artery catheter)
SG	specific gravity (in urinanalysis)
SGB	stellate ganglion block
SGOT	serum glutamic oxaloacetic transaminase
SGPT	serum glutamic pyruvic transaminase
SH; SH_{x}	social history (personal habits, living situation, job)
SHBG	sex hormone-binding globulin
shob	shortness of breath (see dyspnea)
SHPT	secondary hyperparathyroidism
SHx	surgical history
SI	International System of Units suicidal ideation seriously ill sacroiliac (joint)
STAC	Scaffolding theory of cognitive aging
SIADH	syndrome of inappropriate antidiuretic hormone
SICU	surgical intensive care unit
SIBO	small intestinal bacterial overgrowth
SID	semel in die meaning once daily. Used only in veterinary medicine.
SIDS	sudden infant death syndrome
SIL	squamous intraepithelial lesion
SIMV	synchronized intermittent mechanical ventilation
si op. sit	if needed (from Latin si opus sit)
SIRS	systemic inflammatory response syndrome
SIT	stress inoculation training (see posttraumatic stress disorder)
SJS	Stevens–Johnson syndrome
SK	streptokinase
sl	sublingual
SLD	speech and language disorder
SLE	systemic lupus erythematosus
SLEV	St Louis virus
SLL	small lymphocytic lymphoma
SLN	sublingual nitroglycerin
SLN; SLNB	sentinel lymph node biopsy
SLP	speech-language pathologist
SLR	straight leg raise (see Lasègue's sign)
SM	multiple sclerosis (from Latin sclerosis multiplex) submucosal Skeletal Muscle
SMA	sequential multiple analysis superior mesenteric artery spinal muscle atrophy
SMA-6	six-channel serum multiple analysis
SMA-7	serum metabolic assay
SMN	statement of medical necessity
SMS	senior medical student
SMT	spinal manipulative therapy
SMV	superior mesenteric vein
SN	student nurse skilled nursing
SNB	sentinel node biopsy (ductal carcinoma)
SNF	skilled nursing facility
SNHL	sensorineural hearing loss
SNP	sodium nitroprusside single nucleotide polymorphism
SNRI	serotonin–norepinephrine reuptake inhibitor
SNV	sin nombre virus (the most common type of hantavirus) single nucleotide variant
SO	salpingo-oophoritis
SOA	swelling of ankles
SOAP	subjective, objective, assessment, plan (how physicians’ notes may be organized)
SOB	shortness of breath (see dyspnea)
SOBOE	shortness of breath on exertion
SOD	sphincter of Oddi dysfunction
SOL	space-occupying lesion
Sol	solution
SOOB	send out of bed sitting out of bed
SOP	sterile ophthalmic preparation
SORA	stable on room air
SOS	if needed (from Latin si opus sit)
SP s/p	status post; condition after"
SPE	streptococcal pyrogenic exotoxin
Spec	specimen
SPECT	single-photon emission computed tomography
SPEP	serum protein electrophoresis
SPET	single-photon emission tomography
spp.	species, as in bacterial species (e.g. Enterobacteriaceae spp.)
Sp. fl.	spinal fluid (see cerebrospinal fluid)
Sp. gr.	specific gravity
SPS	single point (walking) stick
SQ sq	subcutaneous
SR	slow release (see also time release technology (medicine)); Sinus rhythm
SpO_{2}	peripheral capillary oxygen saturation
SROM	spontaneous rupture of membranes
SRS	stereotactic radiotherapy sex reassignment surgery
SRU	shock resuscitation unit
s̅s̅ ss	one-half (ss either with or without a bar over them) (from Latin semis)
SS	hemoglobin SS (HbSS) (see in sickle-cell disease = SS disease) subserosal Sjogren's Syndrome
S/S; S/Sx	signs and symptoms
SSC	secondary sex characteristics
SSE	sterile speculum exam
SSEP	somatosensory evoked potential
SSI	sliding scale insulin
SSKI	potassium iodide solution
SSPE	subacute sclerosing panencephalitis
ssRNA	single-stranded RNA
SSRI	selective serotonin reuptake inhibitor
SSSI	skin and skin structure infection (also referred to as acute bacterial skin and skin structure infection - ABSSSI)
SSSS	staphylococcal scalded skin syndrome
SSS	sick sinus syndrome
ST	sore throat speech therapy
Staph.	Staphylococcus
STD	sexually transmitted disease
stat	immediately (from Latin statim)
STEC	Shiga toxin–producing Escherichia coli (another name for enterohemorrhagic E. coli)
STEMI	ST elevation myocardial infarction
STH	somatotropic hormone
STI	sexually transmitted infection soft tissue injury
STN	Subthalamic nucleus soft tissue neck
STNR	Symmetrical tonic neck reflex
STOP	surgical termination of pregnancy (sometimes suction termination of pregnancy)
Strep. Strepto.	Streptococcus
STS	serological test for syphilis soft tissue sarcoma
Subq	subcutaneous
SUD	substance use disorder
SUI	stress urinary incontinence
Supp	suppository
SUV	standardized uptake value
Sux	Suxamethonium chloride (Succinylcholine)
SV	seminal vesicle stroke volume
SVC	superior vena cava
SVD	spontaneous vaginal delivery simple vertex delivery
SVE	sterile vaginal examination
SVG	Saphenous vein graft
SVI	systemic viral infection
SVN	small volume nebulizer
SVR	systemic vascular resistance
SVT	supraventricular tachycardia
SW	Sturge–Weber syndrome
Sx	symptoms
SXA	single-energy X-ray absorptiometer
SXR	skull x-ray
Sz	seizure
