= Catastrophic injury =

Severe brain or spinal injury

A catastrophic injury is a severe injury to the spine, spinal cord, or brain. It may also include skull or spinal fractures. This is a subset of the definition for the legal term catastrophic injury, which is based on the definition used by the American Medical Association.

The National Center for Catastrophic Sport Injury Research in the United States classifies catastrophic injuries based on the three outcomes associated with them: fatality, those causing permanent severe functional disability, and those causing severe head or neck trauma with no permanent disability. A fatal injury may be a direct result of trauma sustained during an activity or may occur indirectly. The indirect nonfatal catastrophic injury may occur as a result of systemic failure from exertion during an activity, such as from cardiovascular conditions, heat illness, exertional hyponatremia, or dehydration, or a complication to a nonfatal injury. Indirect fatalities are usually caused by cardiovascular conditions, such as hypertrophic cardiomyopathy and coronary artery disease.

Fatal injury may reveal an unknown "underlying anatomical, or physiological abnormality". Individuals with certain anatomical anomalies should not participate in some activities. For example, contact sports are contraindicated for individuals with an anomalous odontoid process, as any violent impact may result in a catastrophic injury. This is because a malformed odontoid process may lead to instability between the atlas and axis (the C1 and C2 cervical vertebrae). Those with atlanto-occipital fusion should also avoid contact sports.

== By activity ==
Participation in any sport or recreational activity may result in a catastrophic sports injury, particularly if unsupervised or if engaged with little or no protection. Direct fatalities in sport are rare, as most sport fatalities are indirect and associated with non-sport cardiovascular problems.

In the United States, American football has the greatest incidence of catastrophic injury per population, whereas cheerleading is associated with the greatest incidence of direct catastrophic injury at both the interscholastic and intercollegiate levels.

Cervical spine trauma is most common in sports and activities involving contact and collision, particularly American football, rugby, ice hockey, gymnastics, skiing, wrestling, and diving. A 2005 report by the National Center for Catastrophic Sport Injury Research in the United States stated that sports requiring attention for potential catastrophic injuries are American football, ice hockey, baseball, wrestling, gymnastics, and track and field.

The incidence of catastrophic injury is four times higher in college than in high school in the United States. Sport accounts for between 5% and 10% of all cervical spine and spinal cord injuries in the United States, and 15% in Australia. The incidence of catastrophic injury for all sports is low, less than 0.5 per 100,000 participants.

A study in the province of Ontario in Canada based on epidemiological data from 1986, 1989, 1992, and 1995 states that the greatest incidence of catastrophic injuries occurred in snowmobiling, cycling, ice hockey, and skiing. Of the 2,154 reported catastrophic injuries, 1,756 were sustained by males and 368 by females. The only activity in the study in which female casualties outnumbered males was equestrianism. The study also stated that field and floor sports had a relatively low incidence of catastrophic injury, and that July had the highest incidence of injury. Drowning was the cause of 357 fatalities, and there were 640 head and 433 spine injuries.

The study found 79.2% of the injuries were preventable; from over 1,500 responses, 346 involved alcohol consumption, and 1,236 were not supervised. Most alcohol-related injuries were sustained in snowmobiling (124), fishing (41), diving (40), boating excluding canoeing (31), swimming (31), riding an all-terrain vehicle (24), and cycling (23). Other studies have concluded that alcohol consumption is a common risk factor "associated with all types of exposure" (that is, activities) for traumatic brain injury.

=== Classification of sports by contact ===
The American Academy of Pediatrics has classified sports based on the likelihood of collision and contact. It recommends against participation in boxing.

Those classified as contact and collision sports include basketball, boxing, diving, field hockey, football, ice hockey, lacrosse, martial arts, rodeo, rugby, ski jumping, soccer, team handball, water polo, and wrestling.

Those classified as limited contact include baseball, bicycling, cheerleading, whitewater canoeing and kayaking, fencing, floor hockey, flag football, gymnastics, handball, horseback riding, racquetball, skating (ice skating, inline skating, roller skating), skiing (cross-country skiing, downhill skiing, water skiing), skateboarding, snowboarding, softball, squash, ultimate frisbee, volleyball, and windsurfing or surfing, and the track and field events high jump and pole vaulting.

Sports classified as non-contact include archery, badminton, body building, bowling, flatwater canoeing and kayaking, curling, dancing, golf, orienteering, power lifting, race walking, riflery, rope jumping, rowing, running, sailing, scuba diving, swimming, table tennis, tennis, weightlifting and weight training, the track and field events discus, javelin, and shot put and all track events.

=== American football ===
From 1945 to 2005, there were 497 fatalities, of which 69% were a result of brain injury and 16% from spinal cord injury. Today, the most common catastrophic injury in American football is cervical spinal cord injury, which is also the "second leading cause of death attributable to football". The 84% reduction in head injuries and 74% reduction in fatalities is directly attributable to the implementation of NOCSAE standards for football helmets and rule changes for tackling.

Football has the highest incidence of cervical spinal cord injuries in the United States per population. From 1977 to 2001, the incidence of cervical spinal cord injury amongst high school, college, and professional participants was 0.52, 1.55, and 14 per 100,000 participants, respectively.

From 1982 to 1988, 75% of direct fatalities and 40% of indirect fatalities in college sports were associated with football; for high school athletes, the rates were 75% and 33%, respectively. Indirect fatalities were usually caused by cardiac failure or heat exhaustion. Indirect fatalities in high school and college football have been attributed to heat stroke, heart-related conditions, viral meningitis, and even lightning strikes.

The most common mechanism for catastrophic cervical spinal cord injury in American football is axial loading or compression resultant from spear tackling, in which a player uses the crown of the helmet as the initial point of contact for striking another player. This form of tackling was banned in 1976 for high school and college football, resulting in a significant reduction in catastrophic injuries of this type. For example, incidence of quadriplegia decreased from 2.24 and 10.66 per 100,000 participants in high school and college football in 1976, to 1.30 and 2.66 per 100,000 participants in 1977. Since 1977, about 67% of all catastrophic injuries in football were the result of a player making a tackle.

In the paper Catastrophic Football Injuries: 1977-1998 published in 2000 by the journal Neurosurgery, Robert Cantu and Frederick Mueller recommend that "players should use the shoulder for blocking and tackling" instead of "using the head as a battering ram". The purpose of rules against spearing, ramming, and butting is to protect both the tackler and the opponent from head trauma or catastrophic injury. Mueller also suggests that coaches remove players from a game if they exhibit symptoms of concussion, such as dizziness, headaches, nausea, or sensitivity to light.

=== Baseball ===
Baseball has a high incidence of catastrophic injury, the most common being cranial injuries usually sustained during a collision between a baserunner diving head first and a fielder, resulting in an axial compression injury to the baserunner. Other causes included collisions, such as between a catcher and baserunner, or being struck by a pitched, thrown, or batted ball.

=== Canoeing ===
In a 2008 study, all catastrophic injuries recorded for recreational canoeing were fatal, and accounted for 4.3% of all sport and recreation fatalities in the province. Of the 27 cases, 24 fatalities resulted from drowning, and the others from cerebral contusions, cerebral lacerations, and skull fractures. Canoeing drowning fatalities are "often correlated with alcohol consumption", as it increases the probability of submersion and decreases the probability of recovery from submersion. They are often associated with young males inexperienced in canoeing.

=== Cheerleading ===
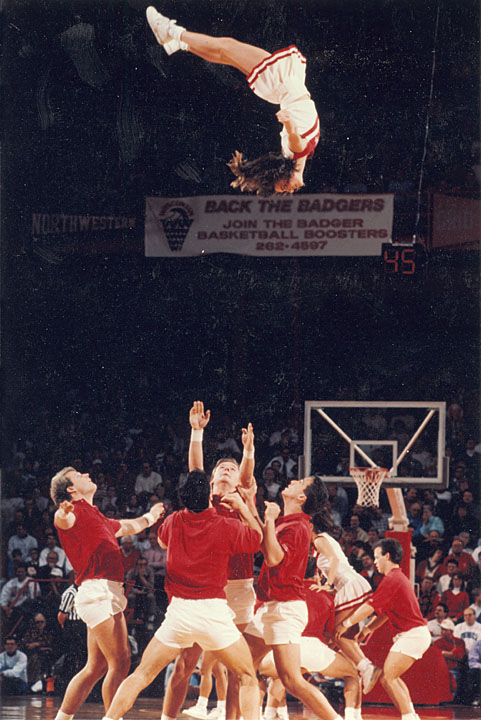
Cheerleading tosses and vaults, particularly when performed over a hard surface, are a high-risk activity

The primary cause of increased incidence of catastrophic injuries to cheerleaders is the "evolution of cheerleading to a gymnastic-like activity". It is the leading cause of catastrophic injuries to females, representing over 65% of the catastrophic injuries occurring in high school and college female athletes in the United States.

High-risk activities include the construction of pyramids, which result in several catastrophic injuries each year, the 'basket toss', and tumbling, all of which are usually performed over hard surfaces. Cheerleader pyramids are banned in Minnesota and North Dakota.

Other causes include inadequate supervision, poorly trained coaches, and the equipment used.

=== Fishing ===
In the Ontario study, fishing resulted in 126 catastrophic injuries, of which 117 were fatal, 110 from drowning. Of these, 119 events were associated with males, of which 112 were fatalities. Fishing had the highest rate of catastrophic injuries to all injuries for any activity in Ontario, as 2.54% of all fishing injuries were catastrophic.

Catastrophic injuries in fishing may be related to equipment, fish, alcohol, or the environment. Equipment issues generally involve penetrative injuries from the use of hooks and harpoons, but may also be caused by the fishing rod, lure, sinker, or bait. Fish-related injuries result from mishandling, poisoning, and contamination from consumption. Environmental causes may include overexposure to solar radiation, lightning strikes, hypothermia during ice fishing, snakebites, and viral infection spread by mosquitoes.

=== Gymnastics ===
Gymnastics has a relatively low incidence of catastrophic injury, that is the number of catastrophic injuries with respect to the number of participants. In the United States from 1982 to 2007, nineteen catastrophic injuries were reported from 147 million high school and 8 million college participants.

Club-level injury surveillance data in Australia indicate no catastrophic injury to elite participants from 1983 to 1993. Elite gymnast catastrophic injuries to the spinal cord have been recorded in China, Japan, and the United States, the most notable being to Sang Lan and Julissa Gomez. There is an "absence of research reporting rate data" for catastrophic injury to club-level gymnasts in the United States.

=== Ice hockey ===
The most common catastrophic injury occurring in ice hockey is cervical spinal cord injury, which most often occur at C5, C6, or C7. The most common cause is checking from behind, resulting in a player falling headfirst into the glass or boards. Such checking was banned from hockey in 1985, which has resulted in a decreased incidence of catastrophic spinal injuries and a reduction of head and neck injuries.

Increased standards for hockey helmets and the requirement that they be worn in competitive play has resulted in a decrease of serious head injury and fatalities. Although full facial protection (helmet with cage) did not reduce the incidence of catastrophic injuries or concussion compared to a standard helmet, it reduced the incidence of facial injuries and lacerations.

=== Porting ===
Porters who carry loads on their heads are subjected to axial strains that exacerbate degenerative change in the cervical spine, and has an etiological role in spondylosis.

In a 1968 study, Laurence Levy recorded six catastrophic injuries to porters at Harare Central Hospital in Harare, Zimbabwe. Of these, one died instantaneously, and five became quadriplegic, one as a result of a herniated intervertebral disc and four from fractures or fracture-dislocations.

=== Rugby ===
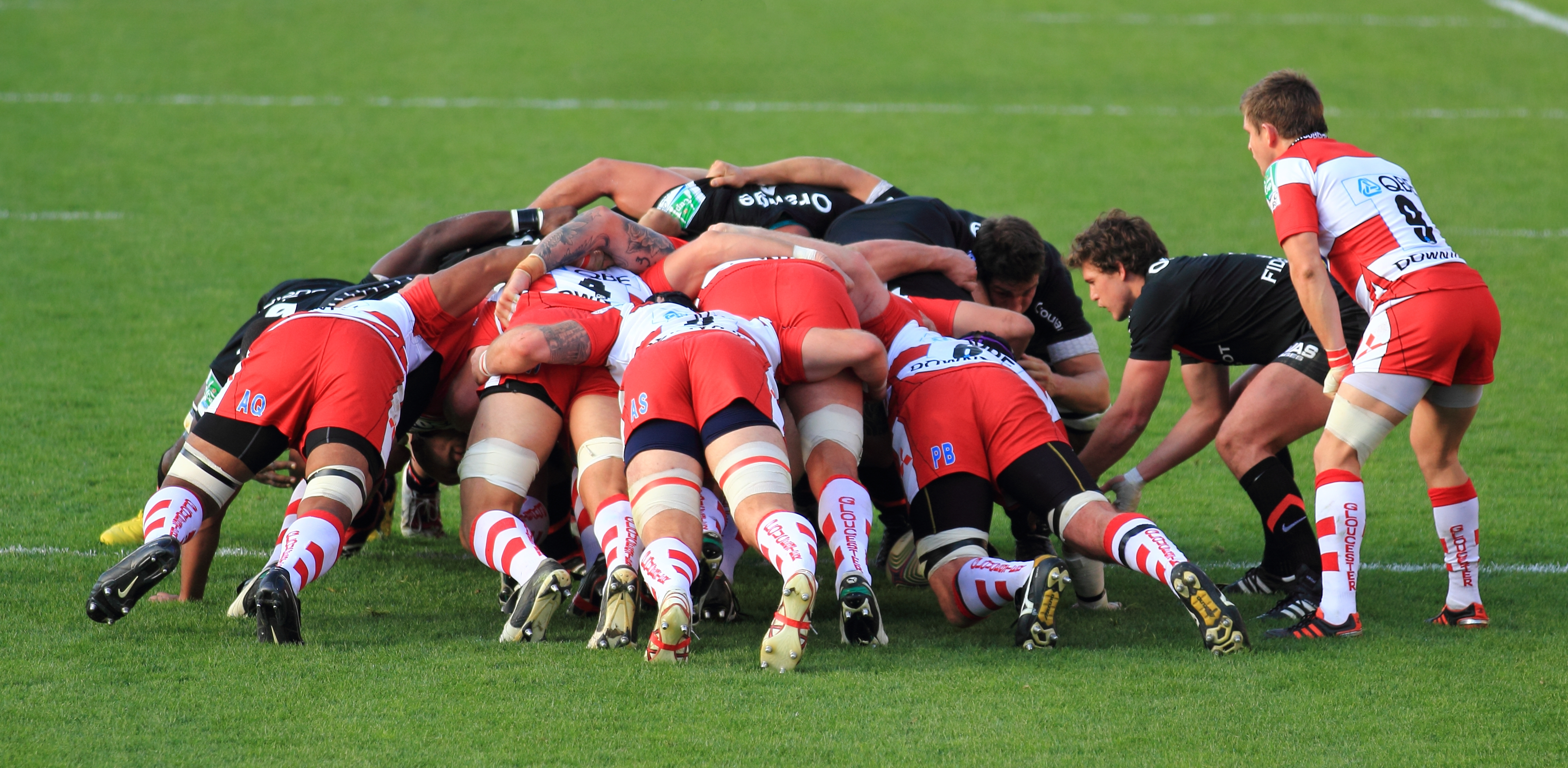
Rugby scrums are high-risk activities for catastrophic injury

For rugby union, the incidence of catastrophic injury from 1952 to 2005 in England was 0.84 per 100,000 per year. In all other countries, from 1970 to 2007 the incidence was 4.6 per 100,000 per year. For rugby league, it was 2 per 100,000 per year. In rugby union in France, the incidence of catastrophic cervical spine injuries decreased from 2.1 per 100,000 in the 1996–1997 season to 1.4 per 100,000 in the 2005–2006 season, which has been attributed to rule changes regarding the scrum.

The most common causes are the scrum, the ruck or maul, and the tackle. Research from Australia states that injury prevention in youth rugby should focus on the scrum and the tackle, and that risk factors are level of play (age group) and player position. It also indicated that "neck injuries in the scrum and to the front row are of great concern".

The use of a scrum cap or other padded headgear does not reduce the incidence of concussion or other head or neck trauma.

=== Skiing and snowboarding ===
In a survey of scientific literature from 1990 to 2004, 24 studies covering 10 countries indicated an increasing incidence of traumatic brain injury (TBI) and spinal cord injury amongst alpine skiers and snowboarders. The most common cause of death is head injuries, which can be mitigated by 22–60% by the use of helmets. The increased incidence coincides "with the development and acceptance of acrobatic and high-speed activities".

Most deaths are attributed to massive head, neck, or thoracoabdominal injury, of which TBI accounted for between 50% and 88% and spinal cord injury between 1% and 13%. Ski fatalities occur between 0.050 and 0.196 per 100,000 participants. Head injuries represent 28.0% of all injuries in skiers and 33.5% for snowboarders.

=== Snowmobiling ===
In the Ontario study, snowmobiling had the highest incidence and prevalence of recreational catastrophic injuries of any activity (290 incidents, 120 fatalities). It had the second-highest incidence of catastrophic injury per participant (88.2 per 100,000), the greatest incidence per 100,000 population (0.706), and the greatest incidence of fatality per 100,000 population (0.292). It was also the activity in which alcohol consumption was most prevalent in catastrophic events (124), representing more than one third of all events for which alcohol was a factor. Other contributing factors include "poor lighting, young age and inappropriate terrain".

=== Track and field ===
The majority of track and field-related fatalities in the United States is associated with pole vaulting. Other fatalities and catastrophic injuries in track and field occur by a participant or bystander being struck by a discus, shot put, or javelin.

=== Water sports ===
Most catastrophic injuries related to diving and swimming in the United States occur when an individual dives into shallow water. It is the cause of 2.6% of all cervical spine injury admissions, and are chiefly sustained by recreational divers. The most common cause is diving into shallow water, inexperience, inadequate supervision, and alcohol consumption.

Catastrophic swimming injuries in the Ontario study were four times as prevalent in males than females. The incidence of catastrophic injury in competitive swimming is very low, and almost all such injuries occur in recreational and non-competitive swimming.

=== Wrestling ===
From 1981 until 1999 in the United States, 35 catastrophic injuries related to wrestling were reported, one in college and the others in high school, an incidence of 1 per 100,000 per year. They were caused by three positions: defensive position during takedown (74%), down position (23%), and lying position (3%). Most occurred in the lower weight classes, and 80% were incurred during a match. In Iran from 1998 to 2005, the incidence of catastrophic injury was 1.99 per 100,000 participants per year.

Most injuries were cervical fracture or major cervical ligament injuries. One of the athletes died, one third became tetraplegic, one paraplegic, and six others had residual neurologic deficits.

Catastrophic wrestling injuries are preventable, and associated risk factors include incorrectly performing a manoeuvre, lack of supervision by the coach, and inappropriate injury management.

=== Other activities ===
In the United Kingdom, the incidence of catastrophic injury per year for work-related situations is 0.9 per 100,000. The incidence is highest in agriculture (6.0 per 100,000) and construction (6.0 per 100,000), and lowest in the service sector (0.4).

The incidence is 3.7 per 100,000 for pedestrians, 2.9 per 100,000 for automobile occupants, and 190 per 100,000 for motorcyclists.

Vehicular accidents account for 43% of catastrophic spinal injury in the United States and 45% in Australia.

In the Ontario study, recreational catastrophic injuries were most prevalent in snowmobiling (290 incidents, 120 fatalities), bicycling (289 incidents, 67 fatalities), fishing (126 incidents, 117 fatalities), boating (excluding canoeing, 112 incidents, 72 fatalities), diving (105 incidents, 5 fatalities) and swimming (100 incidents, 86 fatalities). The greatest incidence per participant was recorded for diving (511.0 per 100,000), snowmobiling (88.2 per 100,000), parachuting (62.9 per 100,000), tobogganing or sledding ( 37.7 per 100,000), hang gliding (29.4 per 100,000), water polo (24.5 per 100,000), scuba diving (12.2 per 100,000), hunting (12.2 per 100,000), horseback riding (11.6 per 100,000), archery (11.1 per 100,000), and fishing (11.0 per 100,000). The greatest incidence per 100,000 population were recorded for snowmobiling (0.706), cycling (0.701), ice hockey (0.462), fishing (0.307), boating excluding canoeing (0.273), diving (0.256), swimming (0.243) and baseball (0.217). The greatest incidence of fatality per 100,000 population were recorded for snowmobiling (0.292), fishing (0.285), swimming (0.200), boating excluding canoeing (0.175), cycling (0.163), canoeing (0.066), riding an all-terrain vehicle (0.039), hunting (0.037), and horseback riding (0.024). Catastrophic cycling injuries were most prevalent in cities, particularly Toronto (64), Ottawa (21), and London (7). Drowning represented more than half of sport and recreation fatalities in the Ontario study.

In the United States, the Consumer Product Safety Commission (CPSC) recorded nearly 1,000 fatalities between 1967 and 1987 as a result of riding an all-terrain vehicle, more than half of which were individuals less than 16 years old. This led to a filing of an action per the Consumer Product Safety Act in 1987, which effectively ended the sale of three-wheeled ATVs. Since then, 35% of deaths were individuals less than 16 years old. The American Academy of Pediatrics and CPSC recommend that individuals less than 16 years old should not ride ATVs.

== Effects and management ==
The types of acute catastrophic spinal injuries are those associated with unstable fractures and dislocations, intervertebral disc herniation, and transient quadriplegia. These most commonly affect the cervical spine, but also affect the thoracolumbar spine (the thoracic and lumbar vertebrae) and physis, or cause cervical cord neuropraxia and sometimes spinal cord injury without radiographic abnormality (SCIWORA).

Response to a non-fatal catastrophic spinal cord injury by the patient varies by "social, economic, and educational background".

The most common initial response is depression. About 6% of patients with a spinal cord injury commit suicide, usually in the years immediately after sustaining the injury. By ten years after an injury, the rate of suicide is similar to that of the general population.

Many patients recover only partially from their injury, and must cope with paralysis or mental deficiency, usually requiring lifetime medical care.

About 90% of patients who are single when injured are still single five years after the injury. There is a high incidence of divorce and separation after an injury, though this decreases beyond the first year after injury.

Many catastrophic spinal cord injury patients improve their education. Immediately after injury, the average level of education is below that of the general population; fifteen years after injury, it is above that of the general population.

Survivors of catastrophic injury may also have catastrophic facial injuries, such as fractured facial bones, particularly those from events associated with ice hockey, cycling, and snowmobiling.

=== Medical problems ===
Numerous secondary medical problems are associated with catastrophic spinal cord injury. These include cardiovascular complications, such as deep vein thrombosis, pulmonary embolism, orthostatic hypotension, bradycardia, autonomic dysreflexia, altered thermoregulation, and changes to cardiac function as a result of injury to the sympathetic nervous system.

Other problems may include pulmonary and gastrointestinal problems, heterotopic ossification, osteoporosis, and other pathologic fractures. Pneumonia is a common cause of death among patients with spinal cord injuries.

A skull fracture occurs when a bone in the skull breaks, and may penetrate the brain, tearing arteries, veins, or meninges, leading to the functional impairment of walking, communication, thinking, or feeling. Cerebral lacerations (tearing of brain tissue) or cerebral contusions (bruising of brain tissue) usually damage the cerebral cortex, resulting in permanent neurological deficits.

=== Life care plan ===
A life care plan is established for the patient to address the patient's needs. It is an individualized document describing the services, support, equipment, and ancillary requirements for the patient that is updated to reflect changes in the patient's condition. It usually contains target outcomes, dates, and timelines.

Components of the life care plan may include:

- architectural renovations to the patient's home, including tub, toilet, and ingress and egress
- transportation, such as an adaptive van
- assistive technology and adaptive equipment, including wheelchairs
- case management
- supervisory care and nursing
- medication, medical supplies (such as catheters), and medical equipment
- facility care and services
- home care and services

This is in addition to information regarding surgical intervention and treatment, diagnostic testing, therapeutic interventions (speech therapy, rehabilitation, etc.), counselling, and dealing with complications. It may also include educational and vocational services.

In the United States, 2.55% of hospitalized catastrophic injury patients enroll in Medicaid to cover their medical bills. In Catastrophic Injuries in Sports and Recreation: Causes and Prevention : A Canadian Study, Charles Tator states that the average case of non-fatal catastrophic injury costs about $7.5 million (Canadian dollars, normalized to 2006) in lost earnings, lifetime care, and rehabilitation services, and cost the economy of Ontario about $2.125 billion annually.

== Prevention ==
One paradigm used in injury prevention is the Haddon Matrix developed by William Haddon Jr. of the National Highway Safety Bureau in the late 1960s. The matrix was designed to categorize highway safety phenomena, and applied a public health model to traffic-related epidemiology. It consists of ten strategies that are implemented based on temporality, that is pre-event strategies (primary prevention), event strategies (secondary prevention), and post-event strategies (tertiary prevention). The purpose of injury prevention is to decrease the "burden of injury to the individual and to society", which includes mortality, morbidity, disability, and economic cost.

The ten strategies are:

- pre-event strategies
  - prevent the creation of the hazard
  - reduce the amount of hazard
  - prevent the release of the hazard
  - modify the rate or distribution of release of the hazard
- event strategies
  - separate the potential victims from the hazard, in time or space
  - separate the potential victims from the hazard with a barrier
  - modify the hazard
  - improve individual resistance to the hazard
- post-event strategies
  - counter incurred damage
  - stabilize, treat, and rehabilitate the injured individual

In Catastrophic Head Injuries in High School and Collegiate Sports, Frederick Mueller states that the frequency of catastrophic injuries may be reduced by:

- requiring all participants to submit medical histories and have an obligatory pre-participation examination
- requiring all schools, colleges, and universities to have a certified athletic trainer on faculty
- enforcement of game rules by officials and coaches, and player education about head contact
- removing a player exhibiting symptoms of concussion or head trauma from a game
- educating players, parents, coaches about the symptoms of head injury and dangers of recurrent injury
- athletic trainer must be prepared to respond to a catastrophic injury event

Preparation for a catastrophic injury event includes a written emergency plan, which should incorporate an evacuation, transportation and communication plan, as well as notifying hospital emergency departments about game and practice schedules for teams and clubs. Response to a catastrophic injury event should reduce its severity, such as via the administration of first aid. In Catastrophic Injuries in Sports and Recreation: Causes and Prevention : A Canadian Study, Charles Tator states that effective injury prevention programs involve education, engineering, and rule enforcement. Education is intended to inform the participants of potential dangers of risky behaviour in the activity, and engineering "involved modifying the environment to create safer surroundings", such as maintaining playing fields or improving the design of equipment.

== Response ==
Sports organizations, leagues, and associations have integrated a catastrophic injury plan as part of their emergency action and emergency management plans, and have also changed rules to prevent or reduce the incidence of catastrophic injuries. Such plans include a notification system, which may be used to contact the family of the injured athlete, athletic coordinators, officials, legal and risk management offices, and institutional insurance carriers. It may also include the formation of a catastrophic injury team, which may include athletic directors, head athletic trainer, team physicians, legal counsel, and media relations.

In 1985, the National Collegiate Athletic Association created an insurance plan for member institutions to provide benefits for student athletes who sustain a catastrophic injury, in response to an increase in workers' compensation claims filed by students. This was designed to protect member institutions "against the sudden and substantial costs of injury benefits", typically obtained by the student via worker's compensation claims and litigation. The injured student receives benefits immediately and does not incur litigation costs, but retains the right to litigation in cases of negligence by the institution. In 2005, 25% of funds for insurance claim payouts were associated with cheerleading.

The National Federation of High School Associations instituted a medical plan for high school athletic associations and their member schools and districts. This allows a catastrophically injured student athlete to receive "medical, rehabilitation, and work-loss benefits" until death by waiving rights to litigation. The institution thereby need not invest the human and financial resources associated with litigation, in addition to a potential award to the plaintiff, and the student receives immediate and lifelong benefits.

Athletic associations, organizations, and leagues update their rules based on research regarding catastrophic injuries. The amount of enforcement of the rules may explain variations in incidence of catastrophic injuries between jurisdictions.

== Litigation ==
In Canada, as of May 2012 the largest award to a plaintiff of a catastrophic brain injury was $18.4 million, and the largest award to a plaintiff of a catastrophic spinal cord injury was $12.33 million.

In the US, as of 2021 the largest award to plaintiff was $20 million.

In South Africa, the largest malpractice settlement for the Medical Protection Society as of 2011 was for R17 million, awarded to a patient who had catastrophic neurological damage as a result of a surgical procedure.
