= SAPS =

SAPS may refer to:

== Science and technology ==
- SAPS II (Simplified Acute Physiology Score), a severity of disease classification system
  - SAPS III (Simplified Acute Physiology Score), a system for predicting mortality
- Stand-alone power system, where electrical power is generated and consumed off-grid
- Scale for the Assessment of Positive Symptoms, a rating scale to measure positive symptoms in schizophrenia

== Other uses ==
- South African Police Service, the national police force of the Republic of South Africa

== See also ==
- SAP (disambiguation)
- Sap (disambiguation)
