= SAP (disambiguation) =

SAP is a German multinational enterprise-software company.

SAP may also refer to:

== Biology and medicine ==
- Serum amyloid P component, the serum form of a human protein that forms amyloids
- Shrimp alkaline phosphatase, an enzyme used in research
- SLAM-associated protein, a signaling lymphocytic activation molecule
- Select Agent Program of the CDC to regulate select agents in the US

== Business ==
- SAP Ariba, a US subsidiary of SAP
- Sayers, Allport & Potter, an Australian rodent poison manufacturer
- Société des Automobiles Pilain (SAP) (1902–1920), a French automobile manufacturer

== Computing and telecommunication ==
- SAP (file format), a file format for playing back Atari 8-bit music
- SAP ERP, business data software by SAP SE
- Second audio program
- Service Access Point, an identifying label for network endpoints
- Service Advertising Protocol
- Session Announcement Protocol
- SIM Access Profile, a Bluetooth connectivity profile
- Symbolic Assembly Program
- Stable abstractions principle
- Simple-As-Possible, a computer architecture designed for educational purposes

== Law and government ==
- SAP scale (2002–2014) used to categorise indecent images of children in England and Wales
- Simplified Acquisition Procedures, streamlined procedures for government procurement in the United States
- Social amelioration program, cash aid by the Philippine government
- South African Police (1913–1994)
- Special access program, for U.S. secret information
- Special Assistance Plan, an academic programme in Singapore
- Stabilisation and Association Process of the EU, for prospective new members
- Structural Adjustment Program of the International Monetary Fund

== Political parties ==
- Revolutionary Communist League (Belgium) or Stroming voor een Anticapitalistisch Project, formerly Socialistische Arbeiderspartij (SAP) - Parti ouvrier socialiste (POS)
- Socialist Alternative Politics, a socialist political party in the Netherlands
- Socialist Workers Party (Denmark) or Danish: Socialistisk Arbejderparti
- South African Party (1911–1934)
- Swedish Social Democratic Party or Swedish: Sveriges socialdemokratiska arbetareparti

== Other uses ==
- Self-avoiding polygon
- Semi-Armour Piercing, a type of rocket or cannon round.
- Space allocation problem
- Standard Assessment Procedure
- Strong anthropic principle
- Superabsorbent polymer
- Ramón Villeda Morales International Airport's IATA code

== See also ==
- SAP Arena, a multi-purpose arena in Mannheim, Germany
- SAP Center, an multi-purpose arena in San Jose, California
- SAP Open, a US-based tennis tournament, also known as the Pacific Coast Championships
- Sap (disambiguation)
- SAPS (disambiguation)
