= Sap (disambiguation) =

Sap is the fluid transported in xylem cells (tracheids or vessel elements) or phloem sieve tube elements of a plant.

Sap may also refer to:

- Sap, a trench dug towards an enemy position during sapping
- Sap, a baton weapon
- Cell sap, the liquid inside the large central vacuole of a plant cell

== Places ==
- Sáp, a village in the Hajdú-Bihar county of Hungary
- Le Sap, a former commune in France
- Sap, Slovakia, a village in the Dunajská Streda District of Slovakia

== People ==
- Sap (producer) (born 1990), record producer and rapper
- Gustave Sap (1886–1940), Belgian politician, law professor and businessman
- Jolande Sap (born 1963), Dutch politician

== Arts, entertainment, and media ==
- The Sap, 1924 Broadway farce by William A. Grew
- The Sap (1926 film), American silent comedy film based on play by William A. Grew
- The Sap (1929 film), American sound remake of 1926 film
- Sap (EP), a 1992 EP by Alice in Chains
- Aunt Sap, a comic character - see Uncle Cyp and Aunt Sap Brasfield

== See also ==
- SAP (disambiguation)
- Sapp (disambiguation)
- Sapper (disambiguation)
- SAPS (disambiguation)
