= SAPP =

SAPP may mean:

- Sabah Progressive Party
- Samoa All People's Party
- Sodium acid pyrophosphate
- Southern African Power Pool

== See also ==
- Sapp
