= Personalized statistical medicine =

Statistical medicine is the science that takes help of statistical evidence for managing health and disease. The statistical evidence is generally empirical that arises directly or indirectly from observations and experiments. The validity and reliability of this evidence for medical decisions are generally assessed by appropriate statistical tools that provide confidence in using this evidence for patient management. Health is understood as the dynamic state that keeps balanced homeostasis for proper functioning of the body systems and medicine comprises steps to bring the system back on track when an aberration occurs. It includes the practices and procedures used for prevention, treatment, or relief of the ailments. Medicine becomes statistical when statistical methods are used to understand or explain the clinical evidence and their consequences, and becomes personalized when these methods are used for individual patients. These methods helps in enhancing the objectivity in clinical decisions and generally consider opposite. This is generally considered opposite to diagnosis and treatment decisions based on clinical acumen of the physicians rather than empirical evidence.

== History ==
The first use of the term "statistical medicine" can be traced back to 1823 when an army officer referred to the calculations of mortality in troops by different diseases. Kish refers the term statistical medicine to analysis and collection of data related to medicine. This continued to be the dominant view, and the science concerned with this was referred to medical statistics or biostatistics until it emerged that statistical medicine is a medical specialty practiced at personalized level, whereas medical statistics is a subdiscipline of statistics.

== Personalized statistical medicine ==
Personalized statistical medicine is reaching to clinical decisions regarding diagnosis, treatment, and prognosis in individual cases by using statistical tools. Prominent among these tools are scoring systems, indexes, scales, models, decision trees, and artificial intelligence/ machine learning processes. These tools help in reaching to a more objective decision. The following are some examples of clinical decisions based on different statistical tools and illustrate personalized statistical medicine.

=== Scoring systems ===
A scoring system assigns scores to various signs-symptoms and other clinical features of the patients depending on their severity with score = 0 for the absence of the feature. The sum of these scores is used to reach to a clinical decision regarding diagnosis and prognosis, and to assess their severity that guides the treatment regimen. Sometimes a threshold is used for assessing the presence or absence of a health condition. A scoring system is available for early diagnosis of malignant pleural infusion and Alvarado scoring is used for diagnosis of acute appendicitis. APACHE-II score is used for assessing prognosis of critically ill patients and a scoring system is used for forecasting short term survival of prostate cancer patients.

== Indexes ==
Indexes are combination of two or more indicators such as body mass index is of height and weight. Such indexes provide more comprehensive picture than individual indicators. Among various indexes used for diagnosis are Copenhagen index for malignant adnexal tumours and hepatorenal index for steatosis in fatty liver disease. Visceral adiposity index can be used for predicting short-term mortality of patients with acute ischemic stroke and triglyceride-glucose index was investigated for predicting short-term functional outcome in patients with ischemic stroke.

=== Scales ===
Scales are similar to scores but generally less complex. Higher the reading on the scale, more severe is the disease. Scales also are generally based on signs-symptoms and other clinical conditions. Wender Utah Rating Scale has association with clinical psychiatric diagnosis in adulthood and there is a rating scale for diagnosis and assessment of catatonia. Glasgow Coma Scale is used to predict the severity of emergency cases and Clinical Frailty Scale has been found to predict short-term mortality in emergency cases.

=== Models ===
Statistical models are like equations that combine various clinical features of a patients with the weight they deserve according to their importance in determining an outcome. Among many statistical models for clinical applications, there is one that leads from pruritus to cholestasis to predict diagnosis prior to bile acid determination and there is another for differential diagnosis of bacterial and viral meningitis in childhood. A mortality risk prediction model has been proposed for children with acute myocarditis.

=== Decision trees ===
A decision tree describes a stepwise procedure to gradually reach to focused conclusion after considering the probabilities of various possibilities at each stage. A decision tree-based approach is available for pressure ulcer risk assessment in immobilized patients and there is a decision tree algorithm for breast cancer diagnosis. A decision-tree algorithm was developed for prediction of CoViD mortality based on biomarkers such as ferritin and D-dimer, and there is one to study effect of air pollution on under-five mortality.

=== Artificial intelligence (AI) and machine learning (ML) ===
AI and ML have made inroads to medicine as they too have been found to greatly enhance the objectivity in clinical decisions with strong interface with computers, AI emulates human intelligence by perceiving, synthesizing, and inferring data through computer-based machines. ML is building methods that learn by leveraging data to improve performance. Both require data and basically based on statistical methods. AI has been proposed for the diagnosis of Helicobacter pylori and for risk profiling for prevention and treatment of chronic wounds. ML methods have been described for discoveringbiomarkers significant for survival. ML approaches have also been found useful in identification of paediatric epilepsy and in prediction of complete remission and survival in acute myeloid leukaemia.

=== Others ===
Several global statistical concepts are also used for personalized medicine. Among them are probability used in diagnosis and prognosis, relative risk and odds ratio used for risk assessment, sensitivity-specificity-predictivities and C-statistic used for assessing the performance of medical tests and mean ± 2 SD range used as reference intervals for many medical measurements. They have direct applications to clinical decisions at individual level, and important tools for statistical medicine.

== Scope ==
Because of widespread use of statistical tools to achieve objectivity in diagnosis, treatment, and prognosis decisions, statistical medicine is emerging as a distinct medical specialty^{[9]} . This is similar to laboratory medicine where clinical decisions regarding health and disease are taken with the help of laboratory results. The role of statistical medicine too is limited to providing help to clinicians to take more objective decisions – the decision remains the role responsibility of the clinicians as with many other helping tools.
