= Fraction of inspired oxygen =

Volumetric proportion of oxygen to other constituents in a breathing gas

Fraction of inspired oxygen (F_{I}O_{2}), correctly denoted with a capital I, is the molar or volumetric fraction of oxygen in the inhaled gas. Medical patients experiencing difficulty breathing are provided with oxygen-enriched air, which means a higher-than-atmospheric F_{I}O_{2}. Natural air includes 21% oxygen, which is equivalent to F_{I}O_{2} of 0.21. Oxygen-enriched air has a higher F_{I}O_{2} than 0.21; up to 1.00 which means 100% oxygen. F_{I}O_{2} is typically maintained below 0.5 even with mechanical ventilation, to avoid oxygen toxicity, but there are applications when up to 100% is routinely used.

Often used in medicine, the F_{I}O_{2} is used to represent the percentage of oxygen participating in gas-exchange. If the barometric pressure changes, the F_{I}O_{2} may remain constant while the partial pressure of oxygen changes with the change in barometric pressure.

== Equations ==
Abbreviated alveolar air equation
$$P_A \ce{O2} = \frac{P_E \ce{O2} - P_I \ce{O2} \frac{V_D}{V_t}}{1- \frac{V_D}{V_t}}$$

P_{A}O_{2}, P_{E}O_{2}, and P_{I}O_{2} are the partial pressures of oxygen in alveolar, expired, and inspired gas, respectively, and V_{D}/V_{t} is the ratio of physiologic dead space over tidal volume.

== Medicine ==
In medicine, the F_{I}O_{2} is the assumed percentage of oxygen concentration participating in gas exchange in the alveoli.

== Uses ==
The F_{I}O_{2} is used in the APACHE II (Acute Physiology and Chronic Health Evaluation II) severity of disease classification system for intensive care unit patients. For F_{I}O_{2} values equal to or greater than 0.5, the alveolar–arterial gradient value should be used in the APACHE II score calculation. Otherwise, the PaO_{2} will suffice.

The ratio between partial pressure of oxygen in arterial blood (PaO2) and F_{I}O_{2} is used as an indicator of hypoxemia per the American-European Consensus Conference on lung injury. A high F_{I}O_{2} has been shown to alter the ratio of P_{a}O_{2}/F_{I}O_{2}.

== P_{a}O_{2}/F_{I}O_{2} ratio ==
The ratio of partial pressure arterial oxygen and fraction of inspired oxygen, known as the Horowitz index or Carrico index, is a comparison between the oxygen level in the blood and the oxygen concentration that is breathed. This helps to determine the degree of any problems with how the lungs transfer oxygen to the blood. A sample of arterial blood is collected for this test. With a normal P_{a}O_{2} of 60–100 mmHg and an oxygen content of F_{I}O_{2} of 0.21 of room air, a normal P_{a}O_{2}/F_{I}O_{2} ratio ranges between 300 and 500 mmHg. A P_{a}O_{2}/F_{I}O_{2} ratio less than or equal to 200 mmHg is necessary for the diagnosis of acute respiratory distress syndrome by the AECC criteria. The more recent Berlin criteria defines mild ARDS at a ratio of less than 300 mmHg.

A P_{a}O_{2}/F_{I}O_{2} ratio less than or equal to 250 mmHg is one of the minor criteria for severe community acquired pneumonia (i.e., possible indication for inpatient treatment).

A P_{a}O_{2}/F_{I}O_{2} ratio less than or equal to 333 mmHg is one of the variables in the SMART-COP risk score for intensive respiratory or vasopressor support in community-acquired pneumonia.

Example calculation
After drawing an arterial blood gas sample from a patient the P_{a}O_{2} is found to be 100 mmHg. Since the patient is receiving oxygen-saturated air resulting in a F_{I}O_{2} of 50% oxygen his calculated P_{a}O_{2}/F_{I}O_{2} ratio would be 100 mmHg/0.50 = 200 mmHg.

== Related mathematics ==
=== Alveolar air equation ===
The alveolar air equation is the following formula, used to calculate the partial pressure of alveolar gas:

$$P_A \ce{O2} =  F_I \ce{O2}(PB-P \ce{H2O}) - P_A \ce{CO2} \left(F_I \ce{O2} + \frac{1-F_I\ce{O2}}{R}\right)$$
