= SAPS II =

Severity of disease classification system

SAPS II is a severity of disease classification system. Its name stands for "Simplified Acute Physiology Score", and is one of several ICU scoring systems.

== Application ==
SAPS II was designed to measure the severity of disease for patients admitted to Intensive care units aged 18 or more.

24 hours after admission to the ICU, the measurement has been completed and resulted in an integer point score between 0 and 163 and a predicted mortality between 0% and 100%. No new score can be calculated during the stay. If a patient is discharged from the ICU and readmitted, a new SAPS II score can be calculated.

This scoring system is mostly used to:

- describe the morbidity of a patient when comparing the outcome with other patients.
- describe the morbidity of a group of patients when comparing the outcome with another group of patients

== Calculation ==
The point score is calculated from 12 routine physiological measurements during the first 24 hours, information about previous health status and some information obtained at admission.

The parameters are:

- Age
- Heart Rate
- Systolic Blood Pressure
- Temperature
- Glasgow Coma Scale
- Mechanical Ventilation or CPAP
- PaO2
- FiO2
- Urine Output
- Blood Urea Nitrogen
- Sodium
- Potassium
- Bicarbonate
- Bilirubin
- White Blood Cell
- Chronic diseases
- Type of admission

The calculation method is optimized for paper schemas. In contrast to APACHE II, the resulting value is much better at comparing patients with different diseases.

The calculation method results in a predicted mortality, that is pure statistics. It does not tell the individual patient's chance of survival. The main purpose of this calculation is to provide a value that can be averaged for a group of patients, since it gives very unprecise values to calculate an average of the scores of a group of patients. A free web-based SAPS II calculator is available at Clincalc.com.

== See also ==
- SAPS III
