= Spearing (gridiron football) =

Illegal tackle in gridiron football

In gridiron football, spearing is an illegal tackling technique in which a player makes initial contact with the crown of their helmet by using their body as a spear (head out, arms by their side). An offensive player or a defensive player can be penalized for spear tackling. Spearing from an offensive player will result in a 15-yard penalty, and spearing from a defensive player will also result in an automatic first-down for the offense.

== 1976 rule change ==
In the year 1976, the tackling technique known as spearing was banned across the board. Associations such as the National Football League (NFL), and the National Federation of State High School Associations (NFSHSA) made it illegal to perform any kind of spearing or head down contact to another player. The National Collegiate Athletic Association only made "intentional" spearing illegal. This was changed to the NFL rule in 2006. This is mainly due to the severe injuries players would sustain upon using the spearing technique. Although this ban might have decreased the number of head injuries, players' use of spearing still persists.

== Injury risks ==
Within the sport of gridiron football, the spearing technique was responsible for most of the catastrophic cervical spinal cord injuries and concussions, which is a result of axial loading. Recognition of such injuries resulted in rule changes in 1976, banning such tackles for high school and college football, after which incidence of these injuries dropped significantly. For example, incidence of quadriplegia decreased from 2.24 and 10.66 per 700 teams in high school and college football in 1976, to 1.30 and 2.66 per 700 teams in 1977.
