= Sapp (surname) =

Sapp is a surname with multiple possible origins.

== People ==
- Allen Sapp (1928–2015), Canadian Cree painter
- Benny Sapp (born 1981), American football player
- Benny Sapp III (born 2000), American football player
- Bob Sapp (born 1973), American football player
- Carolyn Suzanne Sapp (born 1967), American beauty queen
- Cecil Sapp (born 1978), American football player
- Gerome Sapp (born 1981), American football player
- Lawrence Sapp (born 2001), American Paralympic swimmer
- Marvin Sapp, American religious leader and musician
- Theron Sapp (born 1935), American football player
- Tyreak Sapp (born 2002), American football player
- Warren Sapp (born 1972), American football player
- William Sapp (disambiguation), multiple people
