= Medical scoring =

Scoring systems are used in hospital intensive care units

There are several scoring systems in intensive care units (ICUs) today.

== Adult scoring systems ==
- APACHE II was designed to provide a morbidity score for a patient. It is useful to decide what kind of treatment or medicine is given. Methods exist to derive a predicted mortality from this score, but these methods are not too well defined and rather imprecise.
  - APACHE III is an updated version.
- SAPS II was designed to provide a predicted mortality, that does not reflect the expected mortality for a particular patient, but is good for benchmarking. In a rather simple way, it makes it possible to provide a single number that describes the morbidity of a number of patients.
- SAPS III was designed to provide a realistic predicted mortality for a particular patient or a particular group of patients. It does this by calibrating against known mortalities on an existing set of patients, for a specific definition of mortality (like 30-days mortality). This way, it can answer questions like "Did we improve our quality of care from 2004 to 2005?" or "If hospital A's patients had been treated at hospital B, would they have a better or a worse mortality?".

== Children scoring systems ==
- PIM2 delivers a predicted mortality value, intended to be used for benchmarking.

== Other scoring systems ==
- SOFA was designed to provide a simple daily score, that indicates how the status of the patient evolves over time.
- Glasgow Coma Scale (also named GCS) is designed to provide the status for the central nervous system. It is often used as part of other scoring systems.
- FOUR score - 17-point scale for the assessment of level of consciousness. Aims to have higher sensitivity and specificity then GCS, applicable in intubated patients.
- CMM - Cancer Mortality Model
  - specific score to predict outcome of critical cancer patients
- MPM - Mortality Probability Model
  - model to assess risk of death at ICU admission
  - has prediction models for assessment at admittance, 24h, 48h and 72h after
- RIFLE - Risk, injury, failure, loss and end-stage kidney classification
  - has 3 severity levels (risk, injury and failure) and 2 possible outcomes (loss and end-stage)
- CP - Child–Pugh score
  - for patient with liver failure.
  - used also outside of the ICU.
- Ranson score
  - simple score used specifically for patients with pancreatitis
- MODS Multiple Organ Dysfunction Score
  - with similar objectives as SOFA Score
- LODS Logistic Organ Dysfunction System
  - developed for evaluation at admittance and not as a monitoring tool
- APACHE IV
  - used to predict hospital mortality and ICU LOS
