= Sapp =

Sapp may refer to:

== People with the name ==
- Sapp (surname)

== Politics and organizations ==
- Locke, Liddell & Sapp, law firm
- Sabah Progressive Party, SAPP, in Malaysian politics
- Southern African Power Pool, SAPP

== Other uses ==
- Sapp (instrument), a traditional musical instrument of Punjab
- Disodium pyrophosphate, or sodium acid pyrophosphate (SAPP)

== See also ==
- Sap (disambiguation)
