= Rectal thermometry =

Measuring body temperature in the rectum

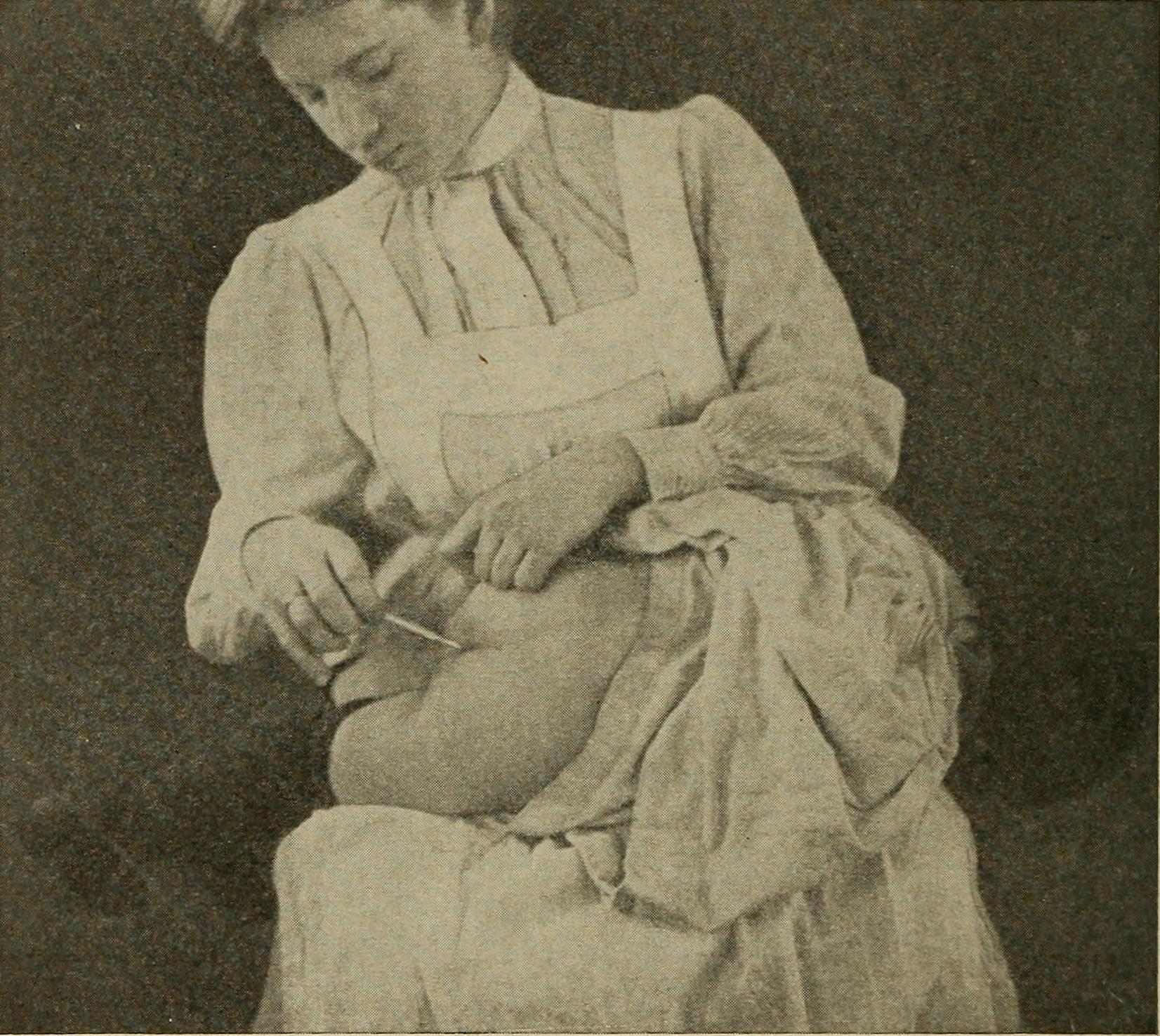
A nurse taking the rectal temperature of a child

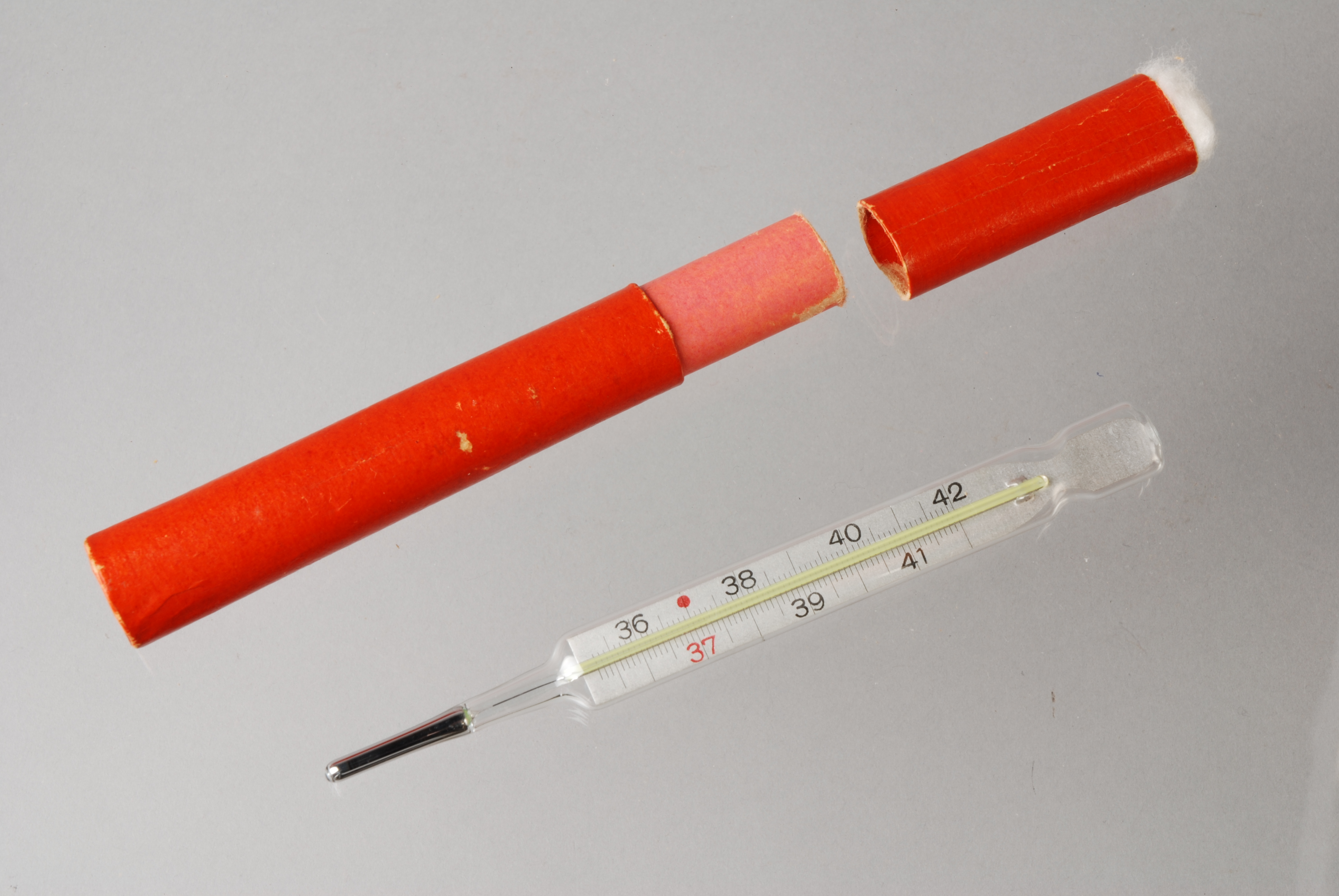
For hygiene reasons, medical mercury-in-glass thermometers that were intended for rectal temperature used to be color-coded red. This differentiated them from thermometers for oral temperature, which were color-coded blue or green.

Rectal thermometry is taking a person's temperature by inserting a thermometer into the rectum via the anus. This is generally regarded as the most accurate means of temperature-taking, although some may consider it to be an invasive or humiliating procedure. Thus, it is often used sparingly, and primarily on infants, children, or adults for whom taking an oral temperature would risk injury (e.g., an unconscious patient, a post-oral surgery patient, or a person suffering a seizure) or be inaccurate (due to recently ingested liquids or breathing through the mouth).

== History ==
The precise history of rectal thermometry is largely unknown, but medical thermometers have long been made in a tube shape that fits into the anus. Medical literature shows the practice dating back to at least the 18th century, and it is probable that rectal thermometry was thought to be a safer alternative to oral temperature-taking, due to the use of mercury and other toxic chemicals in early thermometers.

In 1966, Time Magazine noted:

Near dawn every morning, a nurse walks into the hospital room, wakes the patient and subjects him to what for many remains a humiliating procedure, although it has become routine: insertion of a rectal thermometer.

As thermometry-related technology improves in the 21st century, rectal thermometry is becoming less common, but it is still the preferred method for taking the temperature of infants and pets.

== Use and procedure ==
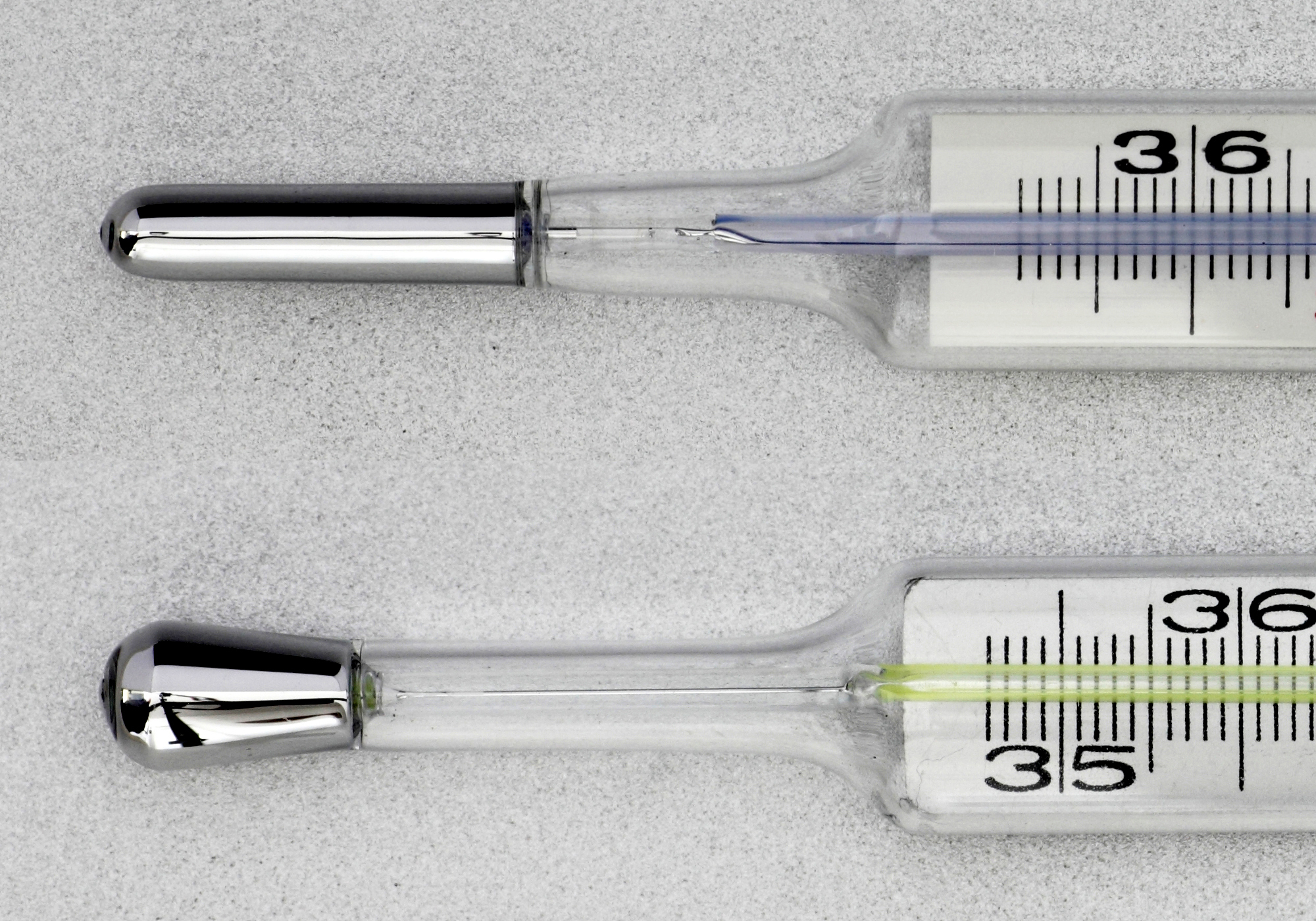
Different test prods: universal (top) and rectal (bottom)

Rectal thermometry remains widely used in pediatrics and veterinary medicine, where it is the preferred means of determining body temperature. It is also practiced by adults at home who want the most accurate possible temperature reading and are willing to overlook the invasive nature of the painless procedure. It is accomplished by inserting the tip of a thermometer, usually lubricated, to eliminate friction when pushed through past the tightly retentive anal sphincter, to a depth of 1.5 inches (3.8 cm) for an adult, or between .5 and 1 inch (1.3 and 2.5 cm) for a child. The thermometer tip must then be left in place until a reading can be derived, usually about 3 minutes for mercury thermometers and 1 minute for newer electronic types.

Anal thermometers are often colored cherry red to differentiate them from oral or axillary thermometers. Their bulbs also have a shorter, squat shape similar to a pear. They are not meant to be used interchangeably with other types of thermometers.
