= Sapper (disambiguation) =

A sapper is an individual combat engineer soldier usually in British, Commonwealth, or U.S. military service.

Sapper may also refer to:

== People ==
- Sapper (author), the pen name of Herman Cyril McNeile (1888–1937), British author
- Alan Sapper (1931–2006), British trade unionist, brother of Laurie Sapper
- Karl Sapper (1866–1945), German explorer and linguist who worked in Central America
- Laurie Sapper (1922–1989), British trade unionist, brother of Alan Sapper
- Richard Sapper (1932–2015), German industrial designer

== Other ==
- Sapper army, a Soviet military construction engineer formation during World War II
- Sapper Hill, a mountain of East Falkland
- The Sapper VCs, a 1998 book by Colonel GWA Napier
- Sapper, a member of the Barksdale Organization who appeared in Season 3 on the TV series The Wire.
- Sapper (application framework), an application framework powered by Svelte

== See also ==
- Sapperton, New Westminster, a neighbourhood of British Columbia
- Sap (weapon), a weighted device used to subdue an individual through concussive trauma
