= Sickle cell nephropathy =

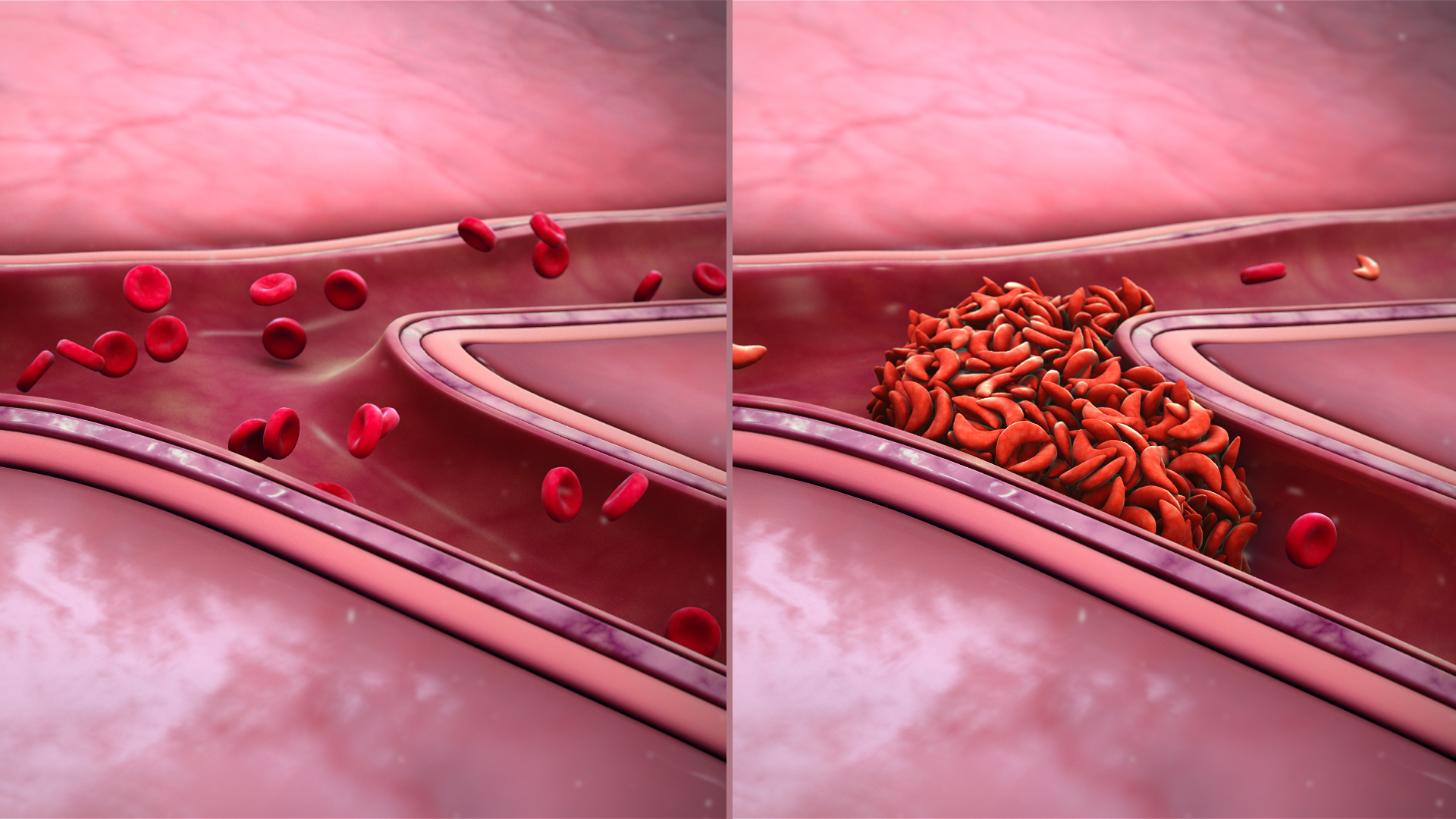
- Sickling of blood in small blood vessels
- Specialty: Nephrology
- Causes: Sickle cell disease

Sickle cell nephropathy is a type of kidney disease associated with sickle cell disease which causes kidney complications as a result of sickling of red blood cells in the small blood vessels. The hypertonic and relatively hypoxic environment of the renal medulla, coupled with the slower blood flow in the vasa recta, favors sickling of red blood cells, with resultant local infarction (papillary necrosis). Functional tubule defects in patients with sickle cell disease are likely the result of partial ischemic injury to the renal tubules.

In younger patients, the disease is characterized by renal hyperperfusion, glomerular hypertrophy, and glomerular hyperfiltration. Some of these individuals eventually develop a glomerulopathy leading to glomerular proteinuria (present in as many as 30%) and, in some, the nephrotic syndrome. Co-inheritance of microdeletions in the -globin gene (thalassemia) appear to protect against the development of nephropathy and are associated with lower mean arterial pressure and less protein in the urine.

Mild increases in the blood levels of nitrogen and uric acid can also develop. Advanced kidney failure and high blood urea levels occur in 10% of cases. Pathologic examination reveals the typical lesion of "hyperfiltration nephropathy" namely, focal segmental glomerular sclerosis. This finding has led to the suggestion that anemia-induced hyperfiltration in childhood is the principal cause of the adult glomerulopathy. Nephron loss secondary to ischemic injury also contributes to the development of azotemia in these patients

== Pathophysiology ==
The development of sickle cell nephropathy (SCN) typically occurs in childhood as seen in the appearance of hyperfiltration and proteinuria. Both are primarily caused by the polymerization of sickle cells in the kidney microvasculature due to the low O_{2} tension, high osmolarity, and low acidity. This polymerization fills and occludes blood vessels such as the vasa recta in the kidneys leading to microinfarctions, leakage into surrounding tissues and potentially papillary necrosis and renal infarcts. Renal papillae are especially susceptible to damage eventually causing papillary necrosis since these vessels are only supplied with blood by the vasa recta. The sickling of the cells also contribute to two other mechanisms which are chronic hypoxia and chronic hemolysis. Hypoxia is caused from both the insufficient ability for the red blood cells to transport oxygen alongside blood vessel occlusions promoting the activation of Hypoxia Inducible Factor-1𝛂. The hypoxia also causes the over expression of endothelin-1 and functional nitric oxide deficiency and due to the chronic hemolysis, reactive oxygen species are produced leading to vasoconstriction and further medullary hypoxia. This nitric oxide deficiency alongside endothelin-1 overproduction leads to the inability to properly respond to stress and hemodynamic changes which increases the likelihood of experiencing acute kidney injury.

The hyperfiltration has multiple contributing factors such as the increased cardiac output caused by the normal physiological response to anemia leading to greater renal blood flow and an increase in glomerular filtration rate (GFR). This is not the only factor because having multiple blood transfusions does not reverse this effect. The other contributor is glomerular hypoxia in that it releases local prostaglandins: a potent vasodilator, and nitric oxide synthase which increases renal blood flow and therefore GFR. Hemolysis also plays a role in hyperfiltration through the release of heme oxygenase-1 (HO-1) in response to kidney injury and this enzyme converts heme to biliverdin with the by-product being carbon monoxide. Biliverdin and carbon monoxide both act as antioxidants and carbon monoxide also acts as a vasorelaxant, and this causes an increase in GFR. A consistent increase in GFR can lead to proteinuria, glomerulosclerosis, and can eventually worsen progressive chronic kidney disease (CKD).

Albuminuria is caused by microvascular damage in the kidneys, hemolysis and endothelial dysfunction. From the increased GFR and the ischemic injury caused by the polymerization of sickle cells, scar tissue develops in the glomeruli which reduces the ability of the glomerulus to properly filter proteins leading to proteinuria. The chronic hemolysis causes the release of iron and free hemoglobin in the kidneys. The iron builds up and leaves deposits in the kidneys, and this causes the overproduction of mesangial cells eventually leading to interstitial and glomerular fibrosis. The free plasma hemoglobin contains cytotoxic heme groups which damage renal tubular epithelial cells and the hemoglobin ends up in the filtrate causing hemoglobinuria. Though the hemoglobin can be reabsorbed in the proximal tubules through binding cubilin and megalin, in doing so it competes with albumin, so the build up of hemoglobin in the filtrate reduces albumin resorption which can worsen albuminuria. When it comes to endothelial dysfunction, there is a correlation between soluble FMS-like tyrosine kinase-1 (sFLT-1) and worsening albuminuria. This is because sFLT-1 prevents the binding of vascular endothelial growth factor (VEGF) to a splice variant of its receptor (VEGFR-1) which induces endothelial dysfunction. This as well as other factors that reduce endothelial function such as stress, hypoxia, inflammation, leads to a production of endothelin-1 and this reduces the bioavailability of nitric oxide and releases reactive oxygen species. This induces widening of inter-podocyte radii and lowers the number of podocytes which increases the amount of albumin that is filtered in the glomerulus and worsens albuminuria. The use of endothelin receptor antagonism could have the potential effect to be renally protective.

== Presentation ==
=== Signs and symptoms ===
Microalbuminuria is an early sign of SCN that has a 30-60% of developing in those with sickle cell disease (SCD).

Hematuria can appear in a range of severities from painless and minute to excessive and painful. The presence of visible blood in the urine without pain occurs with a higher frequency in sickle trait than in sickle cell disease and likely results from infarctive episodes in the renal medulla. Despite this condition typically being self-limiting, investigation is recommended because of alternate causes such as renal stones, or medullary carcinoma, especially if bleeding is excessive and if also experiencing flank pain.

Hyposthenuria is the inability for the kidneys to concentrate urine. Functional tubule abnormalities such as nephrogenic diabetes insipidus result from marked reduction in vasa recta blood flow, combined with ischemic tubule injury and sickled erythrocytes in the vasa recta of the inner medulla impairing free water absorption, all causing the production of dilute urine. The concentrating defect also occurs in individuals with sickle trait. This can lead to symptoms such as polyuria and dehydration due to the low water reabsorption.

Increase risk of urinary tract infection from encapsulated bacteria due to hyposplenism from spontaneous infarctions in the spleen (autosplenectomy). Additionally, papillary necrosis can increase the risk of a UTI and all infections should be dealt with promptly to prevent sickle cell crisis.

Initially, hyperfiltration occurs in pediatrics and then after 30 years old, the GFR slowly declines which is proportional to the development of proteinuria. Worsening proteinuria is gradual, but a sudden onset could have a secondary cause such as nephritic syndrome from FSGS or minimal change disease, membranoproliferative glomerulonephritis, or hepatitis C.

Tubular dysfunction, specifically incomplete distal renal tubular acidosis, is caused by the impaired potassium and hydrogen excretion as well as the impaired bicarbonate reabsorption. These contribute to the development of metabolic acidosis, high blood potassium and defects in uric acid excretion which, combined with increased purine synthesis in the bone marrow, results in high blood uric acid levels.

Renal infarcts from total occlusion which can present with pain, vomiting, fever, and high blood pressure.

=== Complications ===
Kidney complications of sickle cell disease include cortical infarcts leading to loss of function, persistent bloody urine, and perinephric hematomas. Papillary infarcts, demonstrable radiographically in 50% of patients with sickle trait, lead to an increased risk of bacterial infection in the scarred kidney tissues and functional tubule abnormalities. Other complications include end stage renal disease (ESRD), medullary carcinoma, nephritic syndrome due to concurrent HPV B19 infection (this infection can cause benign self-limiting red cell aplasia).

== Risk factors ==
=== Genetic ===
When looking at SCN, the main contributors leading to either a decrease or increase in CKD progression are the type of hemoglobin inheritance, myosin heavy chain 9, and apolipoprotein L1 genes. In those with the HbSS or HbSβ0 (no normal hemoglobin), they exhibit more severe forms of renal dysfunction at a high occurrence rate compared to those with HbSS or HbSβ+ (reduced number of normal hemoglobin). This ties in with the fetal hemoglobin levels (HbF) in that HbF levels are directly proportional to renal protection, and it has been found that in those with HbSS, a greater than 20% elevation in HbF led to no significant loss in renal function. Alpha-thalassemia has also been found to decrease HbS levels where the co-inheritance of alpha gene deletions reduce red blood cells and hemolysis. This inheritance has been shown to protect against hyposthenuria but the effect on other symptoms are unknown. Specifically in the African American population, the inheritance of an S trait and/or a C trait increases the risk of developing ESRD. For myosin heavy chain 9, and apolipoprotein L1, polymorphisms in these genes can contribute to worsening proteinuria but are not specific towards SCD. Specifically variants in G1 and G2 of apolipoprotein L1 in the African American have shown increased risk of albuminuria, and hyperfiltration.

=== Environmental ===
Risk factors for papillary necrosis include analgesics, concomitant cirrhosis, diabetes, pyelonephritis, systemic vasculitis, renal vein thrombosis, and urinary tract obstruction.

== Diagnosis ==
Diagnosis is done through the exclusion of other potential causes. These include acute tubular necrosis from chronic ischemia, membranoproliferative glomerulonephropathy from hepatitis C, nephrolithiasis causing obstructive nephropathy, and papillary necrosis which could be caused by pyelonephritis, diabetes mellitus, or from NSAIDs. The use of renal biopsy is not necessary unless there is a sudden onset of large protein excretions or signs of rapidly declining renal function. Urinalysis, microalbumin to creatinine ratio, quantification of urine protein and ultrasound (to exclude obstructive nephropathy and detect papillary necrosis) are methods used to determine renal function. Early signs include abnormally large and distended glomeruli causing hyperfiltration from as young as two years old. Albuminuria has been used for initial diagnosis in children from as young as four years old but significant damage may have already occurred by the time albuminuria has been detected. Creatinine measurements may not always be accurate because while the glomerulus completely filters creatinine, secondary secretion in the proximal tubules is maximally utilized in those with SCD so GFR may appear to be higher than what it actually is. If exhibiting hematuria, a CT scan should be done to exclude medullary carcinoma and due to multiple blood transfusions, serologies of the autoantibody and complement levels of HIV, hepatitis B and C should also be done. When predicting CKD progression, old age can be a contributor since there is an increase in renal injury and a decrease in GFR in those over 30 years old. Also albuminuria, GFR, and lactic hydrogenase are used in determining CKD progression. The use of cystatin C may not be clear since while it increases when GFR declines, it has been shown that some people with SCN have similar levels to a healthy individual.

== Treatment ==
=== Lifestyle ===
Management of sickle nephropathy is not separate from that of overall patient management. Three-year graft and patient survival in kidney transplant recipients with sickle nephropathy is lower when compared to those with other causes of end-stage kidney disease.

Certain medications should be avoided because of potential damage to the kidneys or can precipitate secondary complications. Nonsteroidal anti-inflammatory drugs (ibuprofen, naproxen) should be avoided because of the decrease in renal blood flow causing a decrease in GFR as well as causing hemodynamic injury from glomerular hypertension.

For hematuria, if mild then bed rest and hydration is sufficient to prevent the breakage of clots and to maintain a healthy blood volume, and possibly antibiotics or analgesics if necessary. If severe, then it is recommended to do an ultrasound to see if there is a complication such as renal infarcts or papillary necrosis. At this point the use of epsilon-aminocaproic acid may be recommended to break down clots but its use can increase risk of obstructive nephropathy.

In children, the administration of multiple blood transfusions has been shown to decrease overall kidney damage, but it is unclear how long this effect lasts. Maintaining good hydration is important in those with SCN because of the risk of dehydration from increased urination and there is a major concern of sickle cell crisis that can be prevented with adequate fluid intake.

To manage proteinuria a low protein diet should be avoided because of the decrease in energy and growth in those with SCN but limiting protein to the maximum daily requirement without exceeding it is beneficial in retaining kidney function. A low protein diet may be considered in end stage renal disease (ESRD) alongside phosphate binders, and vitamin D, with the potential of using dialysis or kidney transplants.

=== Medications ===
Angiotensin-converting enzyme (ACE) inhibitors and angiotensin receptor blockers (ARBs) are beneficial in reducing proteinuria by 50% over a period of at least six months alongside a slight reduction in GFR but there is an unclear effect in overall CKD progression. If the medication is stopped then the symptoms return to similar levels to what it was before starting the medications. The lowering of nocturia has also been shown most likely from the decrease in GFR. This addition can be done regardless of baseline blood pressure.

Hydroxyurea is an antimetabolite which increases the production of HbF and decreases HbS synthesis leads to a decrease in HbS polymerization. One of the major concerns in using this medication is myelotoxicity and the development of tolerance over time. No significant effect on GFR but has potential benefit on proteinuria, specifically in the pediatric population. The use of hydroxyurea has been shown to decrease lactic hydrogenase and reticulocytes which is typically used as a predictor for CKD progression since it increases during hemolysis. Since a decrease in hemolysis is correlated with positive SCN outcomes, hydroxyurea may be beneficial in decreasing the risk of SCN complications.

Erythropoietin stimulating agents (ESAs): During normal kidney function in those with SCD, in response to anemia and hypoxia, erythropoietin synthesis is induced, causing increased erythropoietin compared to baseline. Once GFR falls below 60 mL/min, erythropoietin production also declines and it is recommended to add on an ESA to the current therapy; usually at higher doses. The target hemoglobin level should be lower than a normal patient with CKD because of the risk of vaso-occlusive events. Even in ESRD when those with SCD become transfusion dependent, ESAs can still be used to increase the interval between infusions. If using ESAs, it is important to maintain iron levels to maintain the ability to produce red blood cells especially in those with CKD since sub-clinical bleeding is common, and there is decreased iron absorption. IV iron therapy is recommended if not receiving the necessary iron from blood transfusions but the dosing is unclear.

Diuretics are generally not used because of the decrease in blood volume which can cause a person with SCD to have a sickle cell crisis but it can help treat circulatory overload; a condition caused from blood transfusions where there is too much fluid in the circulatory system. Loop diuretics (furosemide) have also been used in treating severe hematuria by increasing urine flow.
