= William Sapp =

William Sapp may refer to:

- William Fletcher Sapp (1824–1890), United States Attorney and Representative from Iowa
- William Frederick Sapp (1856–1917), American politician from Kansas
- William R. Sapp (1804–1875), U. S. Representative from Ohio
- William Sapp (serial killer) (born 1962), American serial killer
