= Blood gas tension =

Partial pressure of blood gases

Blood gas tension refers to the partial pressure of gases in blood. There are several significant purposes for measuring gas tension. The most common gas tensions measured are oxygen tension (P_{x}O_{2}), carbon dioxide tension (P_{x}CO_{2}) and carbon monoxide tension (P_{x}CO). The subscript x in each symbol represents the source of the gas being measured: "a" meaning arterial, "A" being alveolar, "v" being venous, and "c" being capillary. Blood gas tests (such as arterial blood gas tests) measure these partial pressures.

== Oxygen tension ==
Arterial blood oxygen tension (normal)

P_{a}O_{2} – Partial pressure of oxygen at sea level (160 mmHg (21.3 kPa) in the atmosphere, 21% of the standard atmospheric pressure of 760 mmHg (101 kPa)) in arterial blood is between 75 and 100 mmHg (10.0 and 13.3 kPa).

Venous blood oxygen tension (normal)

P_{v}O_{2} – Oxygen tension in venous blood at sea level is between 30 and 40 mmHg (4.00 and 5.33 kPa).

== Carbon dioxide tension ==
Carbon dioxide is a by-product of food metabolism and in high amounts has toxic effects including: dyspnea, acidosis and altered consciousness.

Arterial blood carbon dioxide tension

P_{a}CO_{2} – Partial pressure of carbon dioxide at sea level in arterial blood is between 35 and 45 mmHg (4.7 and 6.0 kPa).

Venous blood carbon dioxide tension

P_{v}CO_{2} – Partial pressure of carbon dioxide at sea level in venous blood is between 40 and 50 mmHg (5.33 and 6.67 kPa).

== Carbon monoxide tension ==
Arterial carbon monoxide tension (normal)

P_{a}CO – Partial pressure of CO at sea level in arterial blood is approximately 0.02 mmHg (0.00267 kPa). It can be slightly higher in smokers and people living in dense urban areas.

== Significance ==
The partial pressure of gas in blood is significant because it is directly related to gas exchange, as the driving force of diffusion across the blood gas barrier and thus blood oxygenation. When used alongside the pH balance of the blood, the P_{a}CO_{2} and HCO^{−}_{3} (and lactate) suggest to the health care practitioner which interventions, if any, should be made.

== Equations ==
=== Oxygen content ===
$$C_a \ce{O2} = 1.36 \cdot \ce{Hgb} \cdot \frac{S_a \ce{O2}}{100} + 0.0031 \cdot P_a \ce{O2}$$

The constant, 1.36, is the amount of oxygen (ml at 1 atmosphere) bound per gram of hemoglobin. The exact value of this constant varies from 1.34 to 1.39, depending on the reference and the way it is derived. S_{a}O_{2} refers to the percent of arterial hemoglobin that is saturated with oxygen. The constant 0.0031 represents the amount of oxygen dissolved in plasma per mm Hg of partial pressure. The dissolved-oxygen term is generally small relative to the term for hemoglobin-bound oxygen, but becomes significant at very high P_{a}O_{2} (as in a hyperbaric chamber) or in severe anemia.

=== Oxygen saturation ===
$$\ce{SO2} = \left(\frac{23,400}{\ce{PO2}^3 + 150 \ce{PO2}} +1\right)^{-1}$$

This is an estimation and does not account for differences in temperature, pH and concentrations of 2,3 DPG.

== See also ==
- Alveolar air equation
- Fick's laws of diffusion
- Fraction of inspired oxygen
