= Spinal cord injury without radiographic abnormality =

- Other names: Spinal cord injury without computed tomography evidence of trauma (SCIWOCTET)
- Specialty: Emergency medicine, neurosurgery
- Symptoms: Numbness, weakness, abnormal reflexes, loss of bladder or bowel control, neck pain
- Duration: Short or long term
- Causes: Motor vehicle collision, falls, sports injuries
- Diagnostic method: Based on symptoms, medical imaging
- Treatment: Conservative, rigid cervical collar, surgery
- Prognosis: ~2% risk of death
- Frequency: Rare

Spinal cord injury without radiographic abnormality (SCIWORA) is symptoms of a spinal cord injury (SCI) with no evidence of injury to the spinal column on X-rays or CT scan. Symptoms may include numbness, weakness, abnormal reflexes, or loss of bladder or bowel control. Neck or back pain is also common. Symptoms may be brief or persistent. Some do not develop symptoms until a few days after the injury.

Causes may include motor vehicle collisions, falls, sports injuries, and non accidental trauma. A number of underlying mechanisms are proposed including spinal cord contusion, injury to the blood supply to the spinal cord, and excessive stretching of the cord. Magnetic resonance imaging (MRI) is recommended to determine if further problems are present.

Treatment is often based on the MRI findings and whether or not symptoms are persistent. If the MRI is normal and symptoms have resolved no or brief neck bracing may be recommended. Otherwise a rigid cervical collar or surgery to immobilize the neck for three months is recommended. If the MRI is abnormal, surgery to hold the neck still may be carried out Typically, people should avoid further high-risk activities for the next six months. The use of corticosteroids is not generally recommended.

The condition is rare. Most cases are believed to occur in children and the elderly. Males are more frequently affected than females. Outcomes are generally good if the MRI is normal but less so if problems are found. The risk of death is low at about 2%. It was first defined in 1982.

== Signs and symptoms ==
SCIWORA may present as a complete spinal cord injury (total loss of sensation and function below the lesion) or incomplete spinal cord injury (some sensation and/or function is preserved). It is present in a significant number of children with SCI. Notably, the clinical symptoms can present with a delay of hours to days after the trauma. This phenomenon was primarily seen in children but was reported in adults as well. The duration of symptoms varies widely. A full recovery can be achieved without treatment within minutes to hours and permanent injuries might prevail. Overall, there seems to be a relation between extent of damage to the spinal cord and the clinical prognosis. The prognostic value of intra- and extra-medullary MRI findings is subject of ongoing research in the field of SCIWORA.

== Diagnosis ==
The application of MRI plays a significant role in the early diagnosis and treatment of SCIWORA in children and adults. Recently, systematic reviews on SCIWORA described the clinical and radiological patterns and correlations with neurological outcome. Boese and Lechler proposed an MRI-based classification for SCIWORA which correlated with the neurological outcome:

Type 1	No detectable abnormalities.
Type 2 a	Extraneural abnormalities.
Type 2 b	Intraneural abnormalities.
Type 2 c	Extraneural and intraneural abnormalities.

== History ==
The acronym SCIWORA was coined by Pang and Wilderer in 1982 This first description of spinal cord injuries with clinical-radiological mismatch was followed by a large number of case reports and case series. Later, a similar condition was reported in adults. It is most common in children. There seem to be relevant differences between pediatric and adult SCIWORA. In particular, adults often present with degenerative changes of the spinal column resulting in predisposing spinal stenosis. SCI in adults could be due to instability of vertebral ligaments or a herniation of a disk or a hematoma around the spinal cord that presses on it—none of which would show up on X-rays. In older people, spondylosis or problems with blood vessels can cause SCIWORA. The most common cause is being hit by a vehicle while on foot.

Before 1982, the phenomenon of clinics-radiological mismatch was known as well. Historical literature regarding spinal cord concussion, spinal cord contusion and hyperextension/hyperflexion injuries to the spine describe similar cases to modern cases of SCIWORA.

After the introduction of SCIWORA, the term was expanded to adults presenting with degenerative changes. Some authors used the term spinal cord injury without radiographic evidence of trauma (SCIWORET) to describe these cases. Furthermore, the introduction of computed tomography enabled a more detailed depiction of the spine. Thus, the identification of injuries previously missed called for a delimitation from the classical SCIWORA and SCIWORET. The term SCIWOCTET (spinal cord injury without CT evidence of trauma) was introduced by Martinez-Perez. Finally, the use of magnetic resonance imaging (MRI) allowed for even better depiction of the spine and soft tissue abnormalities in particular. Again, a novel acronym was proposed to classify patients without traumatic signs using radiographs, CT and MRI. The term spinal cord injury without neuroimaging abnormality (SCIWONA) was used. However, the novel acronyms were not generally accepted and the more general term SCIWORA is usually used to describe all variants of clinico-radiological mismatches.
