= Intensive care unit =

Hospital ward that provides intensive care medicine

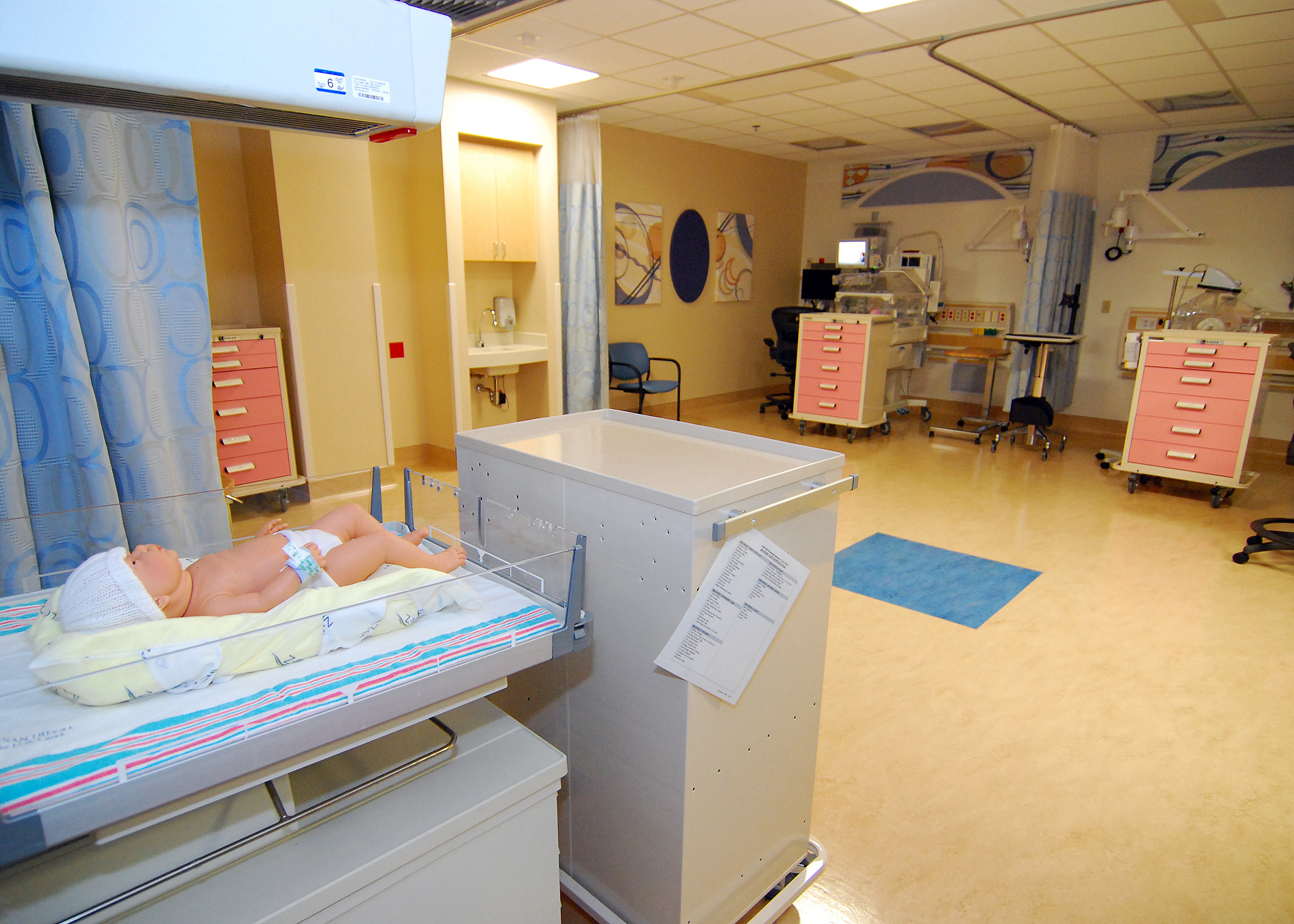
Model of a neonatal intensive care unit

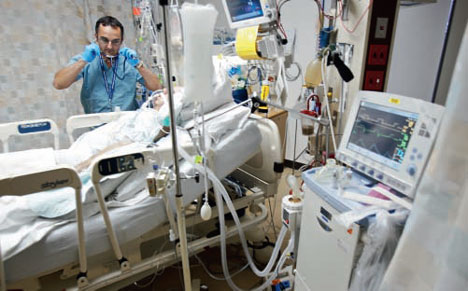
ICU patients often require mechanical ventilation if they have lost the ability to breathe normally.

An intensive care unit (ICU), also known as an intensive therapy unit or intensive treatment unit (ITU) or critical care unit (CCU), is a special department of a hospital or health care facility that provides intensive care medicine.

An intensive care unit was defined by the task force of the World Federation of Societies of Intensive and Critical Care Medicine as "an organized system for the provision of care to critically ill patients that provides intensive and specialized medical and nursing care, an enhanced capacity for monitoring, and multiple modalities of physiologic organ support like an endotracheal tube, a gastric feeding pump, EEGs and EKGs to sustain life during a period of life-threatening organ system insufficiency."

Patients may be referred directly from an emergency department or from a ward if they rapidly deteriorate, or immediately after surgery if the surgery is very invasive and the patient is at high risk of complications.

== History ==
In 1854, Florence Nightingale left for the Crimean War, where triage was used to separate seriously wounded soldiers from those with non-life-threatening conditions. Nightingale provided several simple but powerful interventions: a clean environment, medical equipment, clean water, and fruits. With this work, the mortality rate decreased from 60% to 42% and then to 2.2%

In response to a polio epidemic (where many patients required constant ventilation and surveillance), Bjørn Aage Ibsen established the first intensive care unit globally in Copenhagen in 1953.

The first application of this idea in the United States was in 1951 by Dwight Harken. Harken's concept of intensive care has been adopted worldwide and has improved the chance of survival for patients. He opened the first intensive care unit in 1951.

In 1955, William Mosenthal, a surgeon at the Dartmouth-Hitchcock Medical Center also opened an early intensive care unit. In the 1960s, the importance of cardiac arrhythmias as a source of morbidity and mortality in myocardial infarctions (heart attacks) was recognized. This led to the routine use of cardiac monitoring in ICUs, especially after heart attacks.

== Types ==
Hospitals may have various specialized ICUs that cater to a specific medical requirement or patient:

Name	Description
Burn unit	These are units specializing in patients with severe burn injuries. They require intensive nursing care and medical treatment to prevent complications and aid in recovery.
Cardiothoracic intensive care unit	In some hospitals, patients who have recently received complex heart surgeries such as coronary artery bypass surgery and mitral valve repairs are housed in the CTICU, while critically ill cardiac patients who are not recovering from surgery are kept in the coronary care unit.
Coronary care unit	Caters to patients specifically with life-threatening cardiac conditions such as a myocardial infarction or a cardiac arrest.
Critical care unit	Some large hospital trauma centers, especially but not exclusively in the United States, divide their main ICU, and perhaps even the other ICUs they may have, into sections that cater to those needing regular intensive care (the regular ICU), and those who are most unstable or closest to death, needing an even higher level of care (the critical care unit, or section).
Geriatric intensive-care unit	A special intensive care unit dedicated to management of critically ill elderly.
High dependency unit	An intermediate ward for patients who require close observation, treatment and nursing care that cannot be provided in a general ward, but whose care is not at a critical stage to warrant an ICU bed. It is utilised until a patient's condition stabilizes to qualify for discharge to a general ward or recovery unit. It may also be called an intermediate care area, step-down unit, or progressive care unit.
Isolation intensive care unit	An intensive care unit for patients with suspected or diagnosed contagious diseases that require medical isolation.
Mobile intensive care unit (MICU)	A specialized ambulance with the team and equipment to provide on-scene advanced life support and intensive care during transportation. Mobile ICUs are generally used for people who are being transferred from hospitals and from home to a hospital. In the Anglo-American model of pre-hospitalisation care mobile ICUs are generally crewed by specialised advanced life support paramedics. In the European model, mobile ICU teams are usually led by a nurse and physician.
Neonatal intensive care unit (NICU)	Cares for neonatal patients who have not left the hospital after birth. Common conditions cared for include prematurity and associated complications, congenital disorders such as congenital diaphragmatic hernia, or complications resulting from the birthing process.
Neurological intensive care unit	Patients are treated for traumatic brain and spinal injury, subarachnoid hemorrhage, brain tumors, stroke, rattlesnake bites and post surgical patients who have undergone various neurological surgeries performed by experienced neurosurgeons require constant neurological exams. Nurses who work within these units have neurological certifications. Once the patients are stable and removed from the ventilator, they are transferred to a neurological care unit.
Pediatric intensive care unit	Pediatric patients are treated in this intensive care unit for life-threatening conditions such as asthma, influenza, diabetic ketoacidosis, or traumatic neurological injury. Surgical cases may also be referred following a surgery if the patient has a potential for rapid deterioration or if the patient requires monitoring, such as spinal fusions or surgeries involving the respiratory system such as removal of the tonsils or adenoids. Some facilities also have specialized pediatric cardiac intensive care units where patients with congenital heart disease are treated. These units also typically cater for cardiac transplantation and postoperative cardiac catheterization patients if those services are offered at the hospital.
Post-anesthesia care unit	Provides immediate observation and stabilisation of patients following surgical operations and anesthesia. Patients are usually held in such facilities for a limited amount of time and have to meet set physiological criteria before being transferred back to a ward with a qualified nurse escort. Owing to high patient flow in recovery units, and to the bed management cycle, if a patient breaches a time frame and is too unstable to be transferred back to a ward, they are normally transferred to an intensive care unit in order to receive progressive treatment.
Psychiatric intensive care unit	Patients at risk of self-harm are brought here for more intensive monitoring.
Surgical intensive care unit	A specialized service in larger hospitals that provides inpatient care for critically ill patients on surgical services. As opposed to other ICUs, the care is managed by surgeons or anesthesiologists trained in critical-care.
Trauma intensive care unit	These are found in hospitals certified in treating major trauma with a dedicated trauma team equipped with the expertise to deal with serious complications.

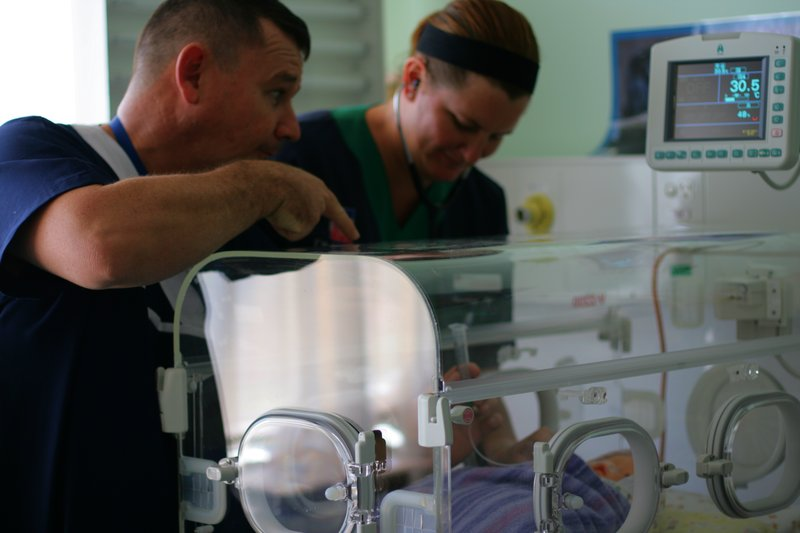
Nurses in a neonatal intensive care unit (NICU)

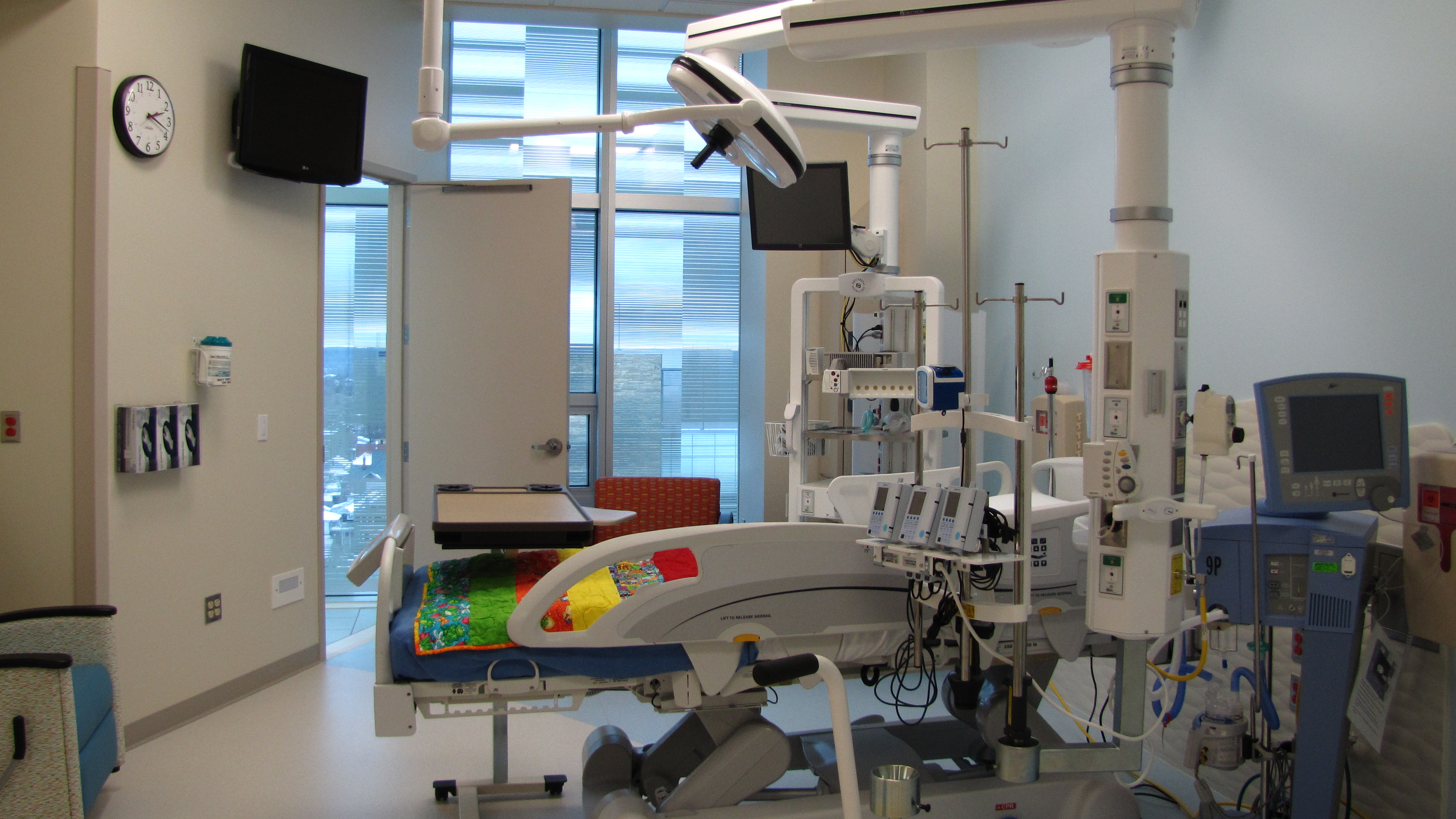
A pediatric intensive care unit room at Helen Devos Children's Hospital.

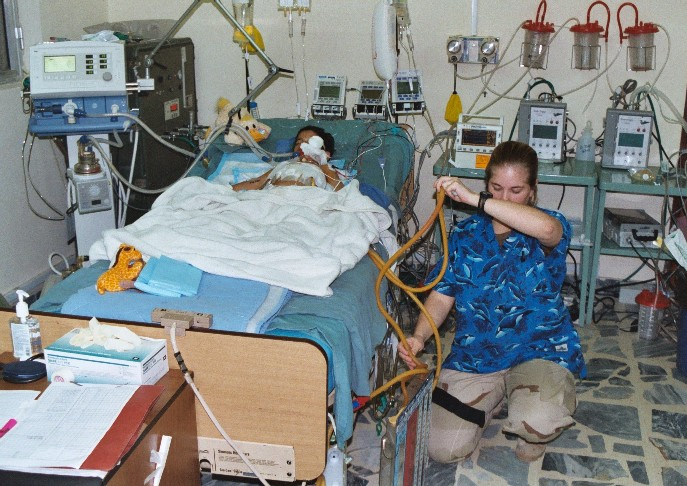
US Army ICU nurse attending to a patient in Baghdad, Iraq

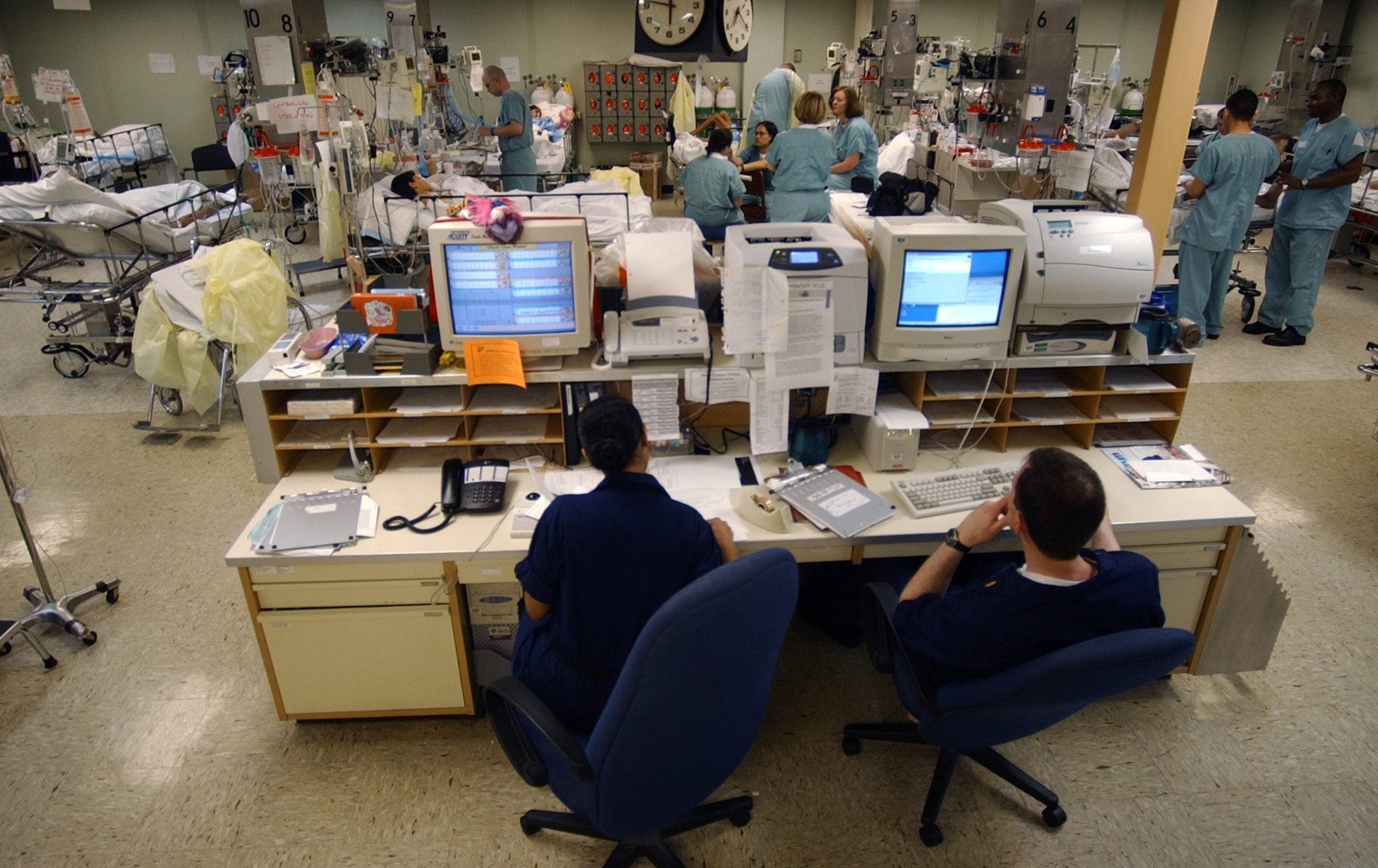
ICU nurses monitoring patients from a central computer station. This allows for rapid intervention should a patient's condition deteriorate whilst a member of staff is not immediately at the bedside.

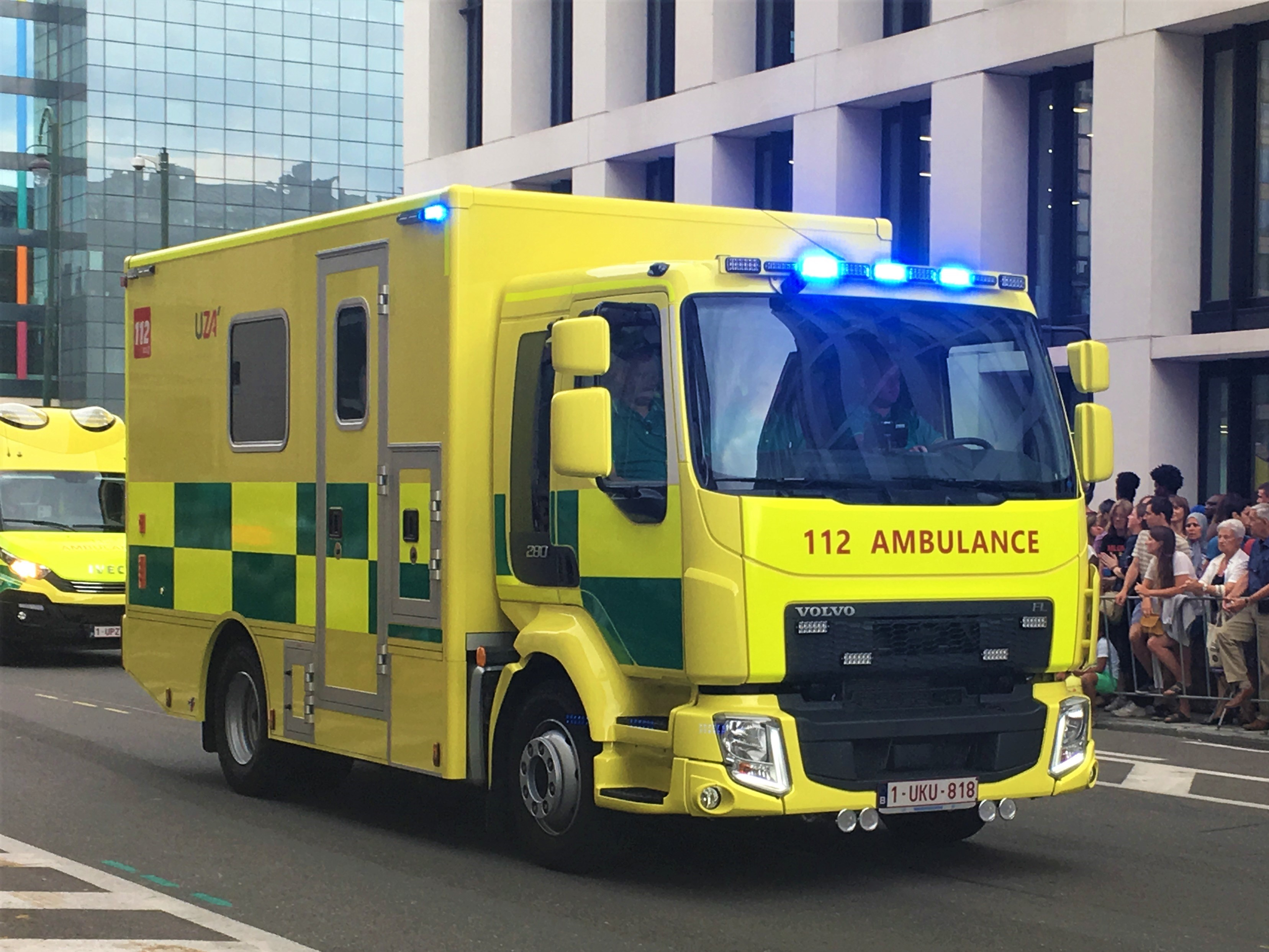
Mobile ICU of the university hospital in Antwerp, Belgium

== Equipment and systems ==
Common equipment in an ICU includes mechanical ventilators to assist breathing through an endotracheal tube or a tracheostomy tube; cardiac monitors for monitoring cardiac condition; equipment for the constant monitoring of bodily functions; a web of intravenous lines, feeding tubes, nasogastric tubes, suction pumps, drains, and catheters, syringe pumps; and a wide array of drugs to treat the primary condition(s) of hospitalization. Medically induced comas, analgesics, and induced sedation are common ICU tools needed and used to reduce pain and prevent secondary infections.

== Quality of care ==
The available data suggests a relation between ICU volume and quality of care for mechanically ventilated patients. After adjustment for severity of illnesses, demographic variables, and characteristics of different ICUs (including staffing by intensivists), higher ICU staffing was significantly associated with lower ICU and hospital mortality rates. A ratio of 2 patients to 1 nurse is recommended for a medical ICU, which contrasts to the ratio of 4:1 or 5:1 typically seen on medical floors. This varies from country to country, though; e.g., in Australia and the United Kingdom, most ICUs are staffed on a 2:1 basis (for high-dependency patients who require closer monitoring or more intensive treatment than a hospital ward can offer) or on a 1:1 basis for patients requiring extreme intensive support and monitoring; for example, a patient on multiple vasoactive medications to keep their blood pressure high enough to perfuse tissue. The patient may require multiple machines; Examples: continuous dialysis CRRT, a intra-aortic balloon pump, ECMO.

International guidelines recommend that every patient gets checked for delirium every day (usually twice or as much required) using a validated clinical tool. The two most widely used are the Confusion Assessment Method for the ICU (CAM-ICU) and the Intensive Care Delirium Screening Checklist (ICDSC). There are translations of these tools in over 20 languages and they are used globally in many ICU's. Nurses are the largest group of healthcare professionals working in ICUs. There are findings which have demonstrated that nursing leadership styles have impact on ICU quality measures particularly structural and outcomes measures.

== Operational logistics ==
In the United States, up to 20% of hospital beds can be labelled as intensive-care beds; in the United Kingdom, intensive care usually will comprise only up to 2% of total beds. This high disparity is attributed to admission of patients in the UK only when considered the most severely ill.

Intensive care is an expensive healthcare service. A recent study conducted in the United States found that hospital stays involving ICU services were 2.5 times more costly than other hospital stays.

In the United Kingdom in 2003–04, the average cost of funding an intensive care unit was:

- £838 per bed per day for a neonatal intensive care unit
- £1,702 per bed per day for a pediatric intensive care unit
- £1,328 per bed per day for an adult intensive care unit

== Remote collaboration systems ==
Some hospitals have installed teleconferencing systems that allow doctors and nurses at a central facility (either in the same building, at a central location serving several local hospitals, or in rural locations another more urban facility) to collaborate with on-site staff and speak with patients (a form of [telemedicine]). This is variously called an eICU, virtual ICU, or tele-ICU. Remote staff typically have access to vital signs from live monitoring systems, and electronic health records so they may have access to a broader view of a patient's medical history. Often bedside and remote staff have met in person and may rotate responsibilities. Such systems are beneficial to intensive care units in order to ensure correct procedures are being followed for patients vulnerable to deterioration, to access vital signs remotely in order to keep patients that would have to be transferred to a larger facility if need be he/she may have demonstrated a significant decrease in stability.

== See also ==
- ICU quality and management tools
- Intensive care medicine
- Intensive Care Medicine (journal)
- Neonatal intensive care unit
- Open-source ventilator
- Pediatric intensive care unit
