= William Ganz =

American cardiologist (1919–2009)

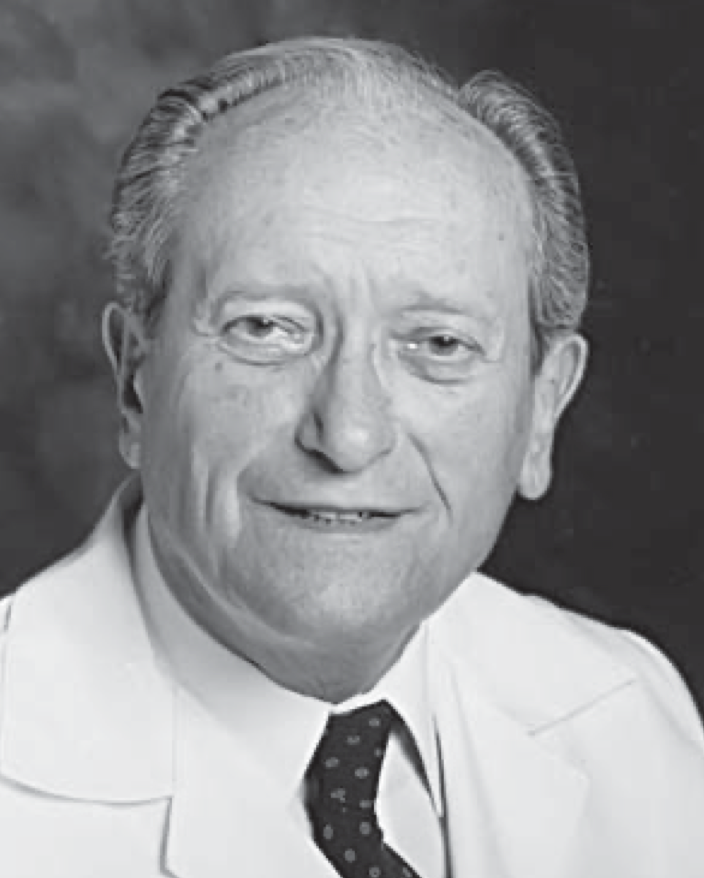
- Born: January 7, 1919; Košice, Czechoslovakia (now Slovakia)
- Died: November 10, 2009 (aged 90); Los Angeles, California
- Occupation: cardiologist
- Known for: co-inventor of the pulmonary artery catheter

William Ganz (January 7, 1919 – November 10, 2009) was a Slovakia-born American cardiologist who co-invented the pulmonary artery catheter, often referred to as the Swan-Ganz catheter, with Jeremy Swan in 1970. The catheter is used to monitor heart conditions, especially in intensive care units. Ganz was also one of the first cardiologists to use enzymes to open clogged arteries, which can lead to heart attacks.

Ganz was born in Kosice, Czechoslovakia, located in modern-day Slovakia, in 1919. He enrolled at the Charles University School of Medicine in Prague, Czechoslovakia, in 1938. The school was closed in 1940 following the start of Nazi Germany's occupation Czechoslovakia. Ganz, who was Jewish, was sent to a Nazi labor camp in Hungary during World War II. He was scheduled to be sent to Auschwitz in 1944, but escaped and went into hiding. After World War II, Ganz graduated from Charles University in 1947 at the top of his class.

Ganz worked in Czechoslovakia, which was under Communist rule at the time. In 1966, Ganz was permitted to take his wife, Magda, and the couple's two sons on a vacation to Italy. Instead, the family went to Vienna, Austria, where they applied for a visa to the United States. He had relatives in Los Angeles, which allowed the family to move to the United States. Ganz gained a position at Cedars-Sinai Medical Center, where he remained for the rest of his career.

Ganz and Dr. Jeremy Swan first developed the idea for the pulmonary artery catheter in 1970. A balloon is placed at the end of a flexible catheter, which is inserted into the pulmonary artery. Additionally, Ganz had a role in the development of thrombolysis, in which enzymes break down blood clots.

Gang had a wife, Magda Danz, who died in 2005, and together they had two sons, Dr. Peter Ganz, a cardiologist at UCSF, and Dr. Tomas Ganz, a pulmonologist at UCLA. He died of natural causes on November 11, 2009, at the age of 90.
