= Cedars-Sinai Medical Center =

Hospital in Los Angeles, California, US

- Cedars-Sinai Health System

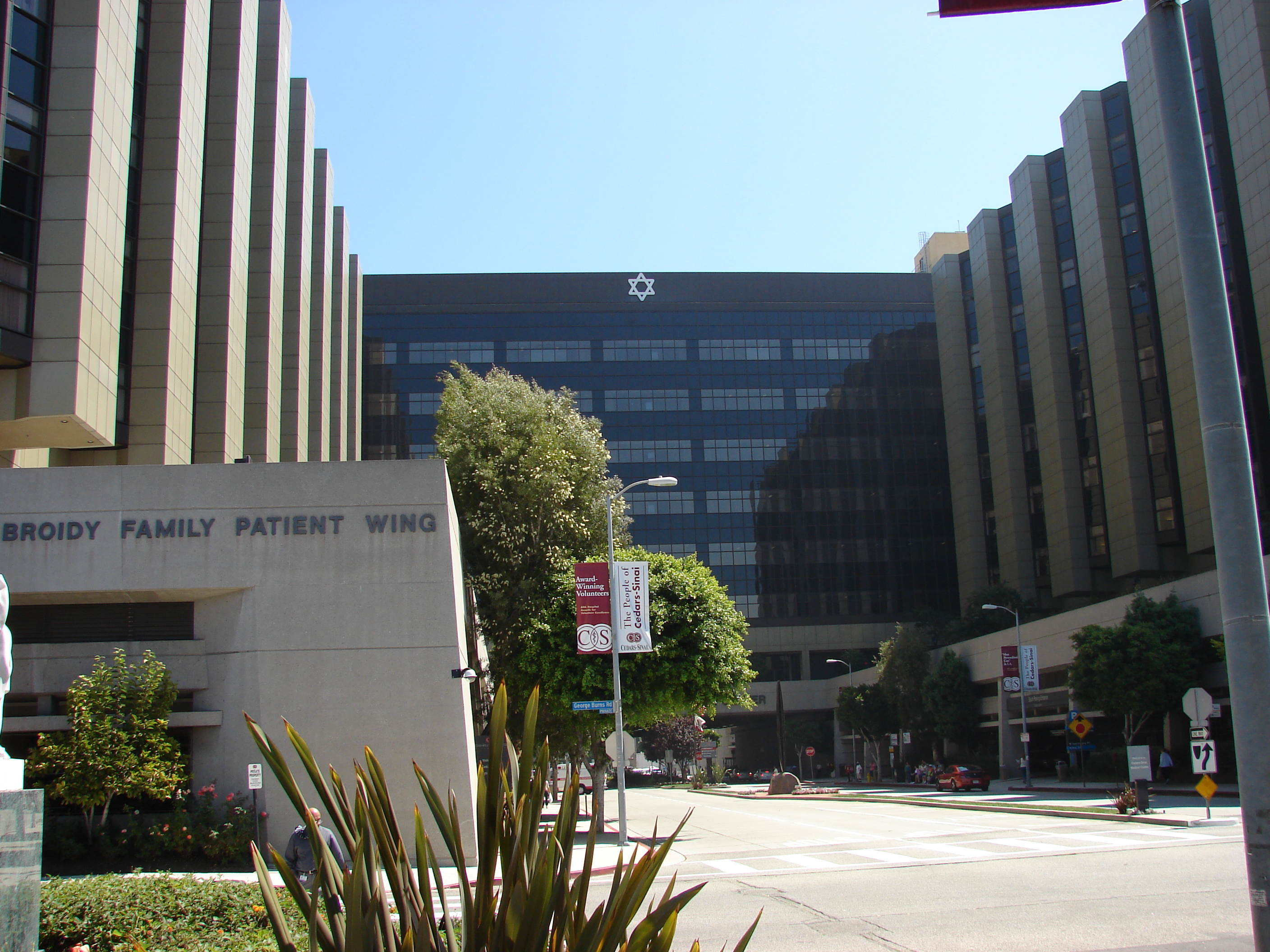
- The North and South Towers of the Cedars-Sinai Medical Center

Geography
- Location: 8700 Beverly Boulevard, Los Angeles, California, United States
- Coordinates: 34°04′31″N 118°22′50″W

Organization
- Care system: Non-profit
- Type: Teaching
- Patron: Kaspare Cohn

Services
- Emergency department: Level I trauma center
- Beds: 919 beds
- Speciality: General

Helipads
- Helipad: FAA LID: CA46
Number	Length		Surface
Number	ft	m	Surface
H1	62 × 62	19 × 19	concrete
H2	80 × 80	24 × 24	asphalt/concrete

History
- Founded: 1902, 1918, 1961

Links
- Website: cedars-sinai.org/home.html
- Lists: Hospitals in California

Cedars-Sinai Medical Center is a 919-bed teaching hospital and research center in Los Angeles, California, United States.

It is part of the Cedars-Sinai Health System, which includes other hospitals and a network of local doctors' offices that display its name along with a number of research institutes.

The hospital is certified as a Level I trauma center. It has a staff of over 2,000 physicians and 10,000 employees, supported by 2,000 volunteers and more than 40 community groups.

Its research institutes focus on biomedical research and technologically advanced medical education. The academic enterprise at Cedars-Sinai has research centers covering cardiovascular, genetics, gene therapy, gastroenterology, neuroscience, immunology, surgery, organ transplantation, stem cells, biomedical imaging, and cancer, with more than 500 clinical trials and 900 research projects currently underway, led by 230 principal investigators.

== History ==
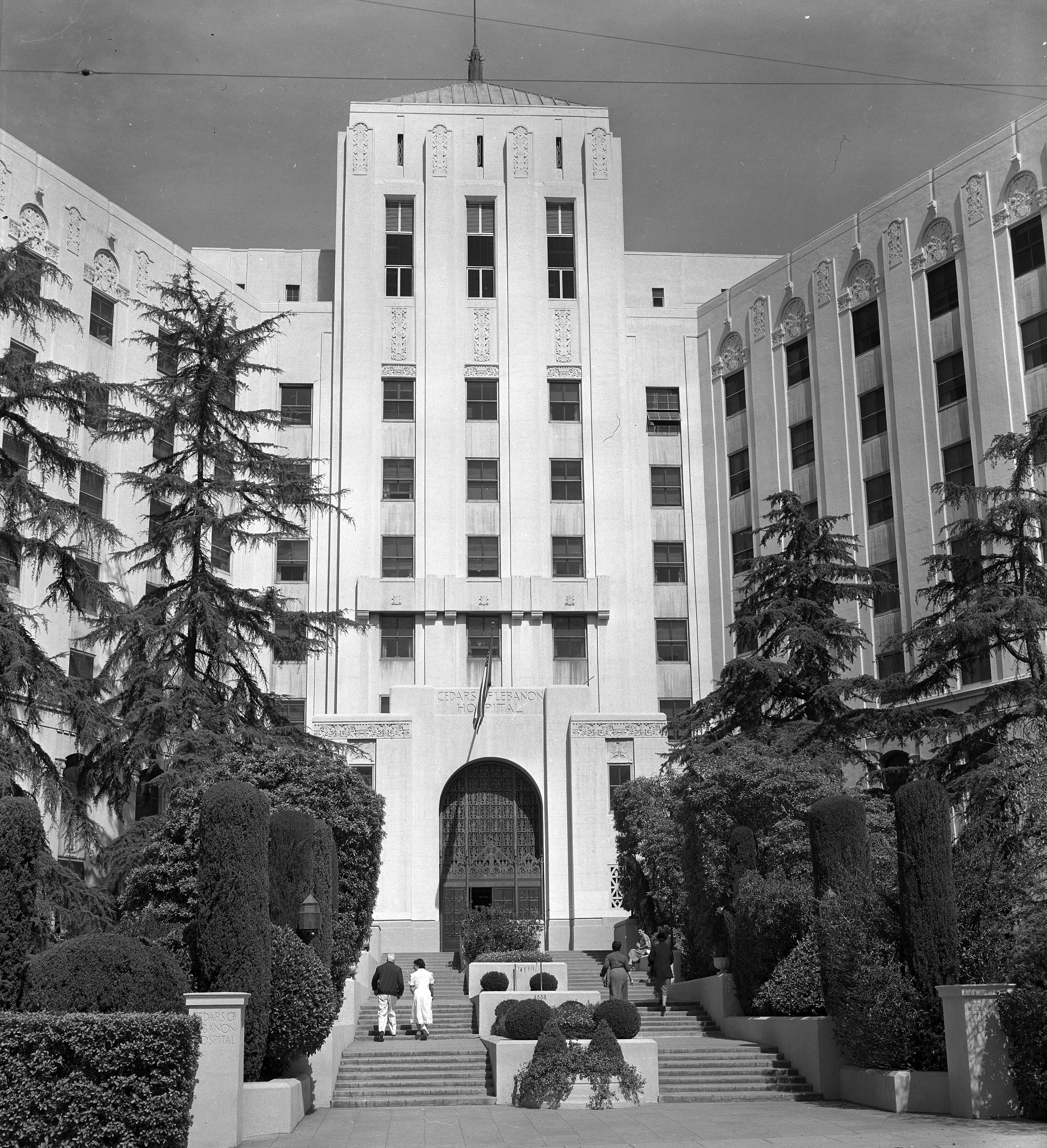
The entrance to the old Cedars of Lebanon Hospital, 1956. This building is now owned by the Church of Scientology.

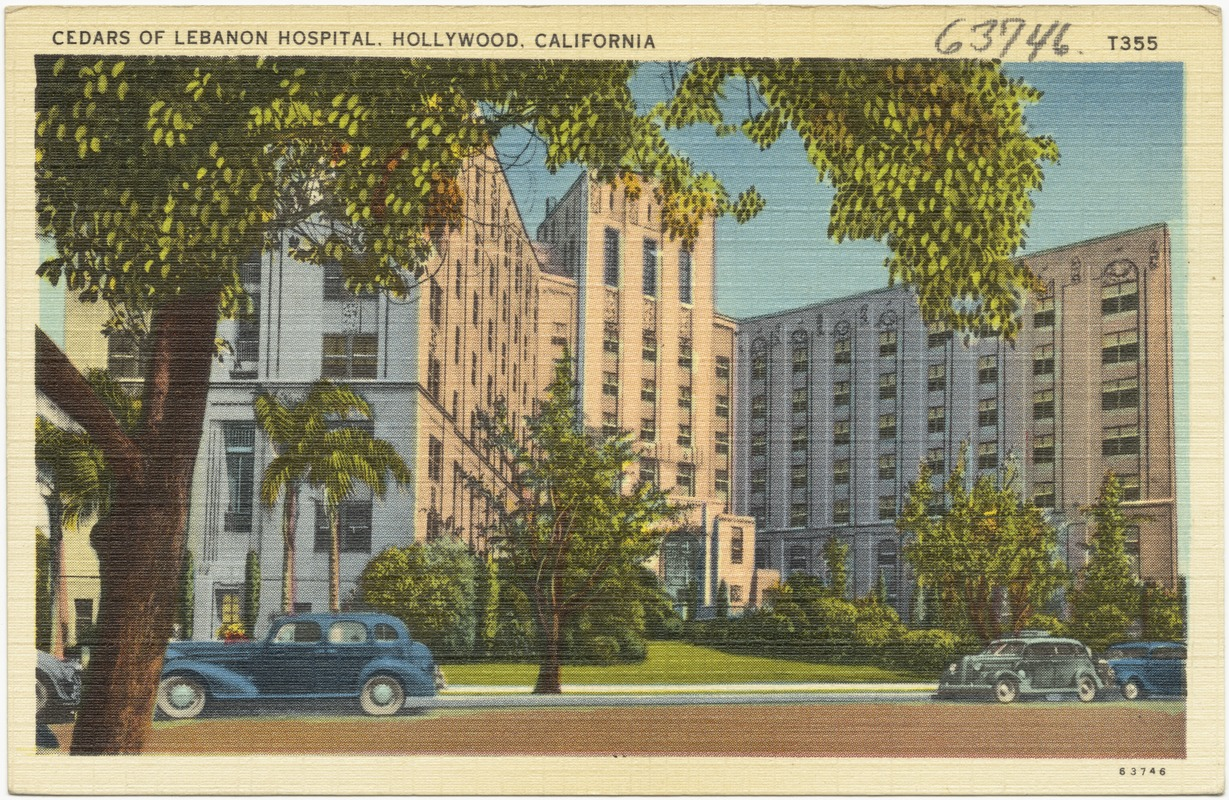
Cedars of Lebanon Hospital Hollywood

=== Cedars of Lebanon Hospital ===
Kaspare Cohn Hospital was founded in 1902, named for its major donor, a Jewish businessman who later founded the bank that became Union Bank & Trust Company and is now part of U.S. Bancorp. The hospital's first superintendent, Sarah Vasen, was a graduate of the University of Iowa Medical School who had been the superintendent and obstetrician for the Jewish Maternity Home in Philadelphia. She was one of Los Angeles's first women doctors.

The hospital was intended to serve both the Jewish community and the patients of Jewish doctors, who were denied admitting privileges in other hospitals because of discrimination.

In 1930, the hospital moved to a new building in Hollywood and changed its name to Cedars of Lebanon Hospital, after the trees mentioned frequently in Scripture and reputed to have medicinal properties.

=== Mount Sinai Hospital ===
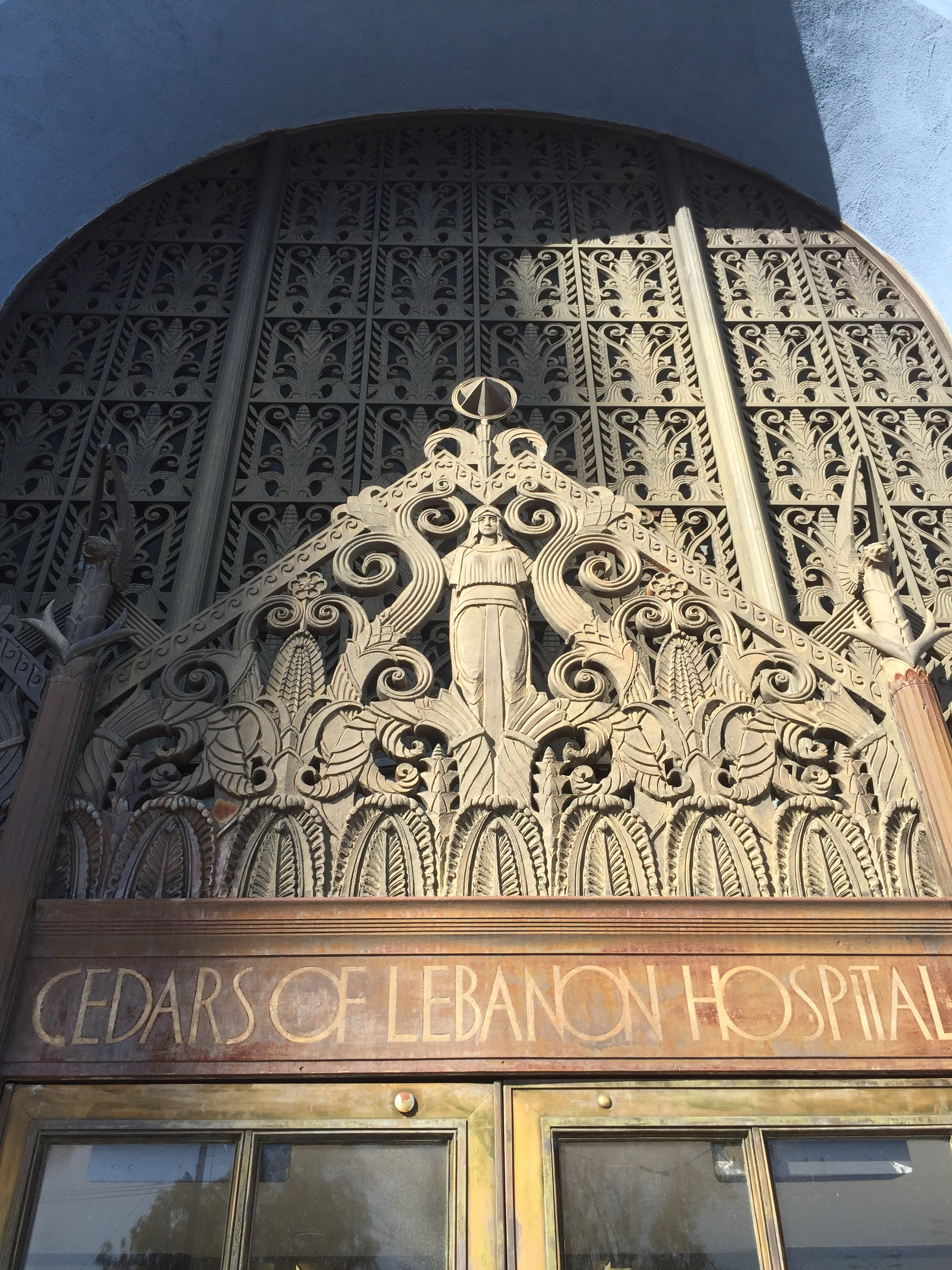
Cedars of Lebanon Art Deco grillwork

The Bikur Cholim Society, named for the Talmudic obligation to care for the sick, opened a hospice in 1923 that became Mount Sinai Home for the Incurables. It was renamed Mount Sinai Hospital in 1926 and moved to a 50-bed facility on Bonnie Beach Place in Los Angeles. In 1955, it moved to Beverly Boulevard, now the location of Cedars-Sinai.

=== Merger of Cedars of Lebanon Hospital and Mount Sinai Hospital ===
Discussions to merge Cedars of Lebanon and Mount Sinai began in the 1960s. Population growth in Los Angeles, along with the opportunity to expand free care, research and medical education required a larger patient base and expanded facilities.

The merger process, led by Irving Feintech and Steven Broidy Sr., led to groundbreaking in 1972 for a 1.6-million-square-foot medical center. It received its first patients in 1976. The new hospital was designed jointly by Albert C. Martin & Associates and Charles Luckman Associates. The main contractor was Robert E. McKee, Inc.

The merged hospital includes a full-time Jewish chaplain.

The Cedars-Sinai Health System was established in 1994, combining the Medical Center with the Burns and Allen Research Institute, the Cedars-Sinai Medical Foundation and the Physician-Hospital Organization. The Burns and Allen Research Institute is dedicated on George Burns' 100th birthday two years later in 1996.

The Saperstein Critical Care Tower opened in 2006 with 150 ICU beds. By 2010, Cedars-Sinai had 958 beds and 2,000 doctors. The institution maintains research institutes specializing in areas including genetics, neurosurgery, cancer, and cardiology, and serves a diverse population, including low-income and elderly patients. Cedars-Sinai also became known around this time for its medical education. The Advanced Health Sciences Pavilion opened in 2013. It houses the neurosciences programs, the Heart Institute and Regenerative Medicine Institute laboratories, outpatient surgery suites, an imaging area, and an education center.

The Advanced Health Sciences Pavilion, housing the Smidt Heart Institute and Samuel Oschin Cancer Center, opened in 2013. Cedars-Sinai acquired Marina Del Rey Hospital and its neighboring medical office building in 2015.

Huntington Health became an affiliate of Cedars-Sinai in August 2021. Since then, Huntington Health has hired more specialists and expanded access to cancer care and clinical trials. Fair Oaks Women’s Health also joined Cedars-Sinai. Huntington Health’s NICU and pediatric doctors can consult with Cedars-Sinai specialists remotely and send complex cases directly to Cedars-Sinai Guerin Children’s Hospital in Los Angeles.

The Shapell Guerin Family Foundation gave $100 million to Cedars-Sinai Medical Center to establish a children’s health care center named for the Guerin family in 2022. This was the largest lifetime gift in Cedars-Sinai’s history.

Cedars-Sinai founded its Health Sciences University in October 2024. The university offers training in clinical, basic, and translational sciences, as well as research and vocational programs. At the time, Cedars-Sinai was staffed with 315 graduate students and postdoctoral scientists and 540 medical residents and fellows. By 2024, Cedars-Sinai received 171 grants from the National Institutes of Health, totaling nearly $100 million. Cedars-Sinai and Torrance Memorial Medical Center were affiliated under a new parent organization in the same year.

Cedars-Sinai was the largest hospital in Southern California by net patient revenue in 2025. The nonprofit academic medical center is licensed for 915 beds, has over 3,000 physicians on staff, and employs more than 16,000 people across its hospitals and medical network. The quaternary care facility maintains a connection to research, and education.

== Rankings ==
In the 2025 U.S. News & World Report Best Hospital Rankings, Cedars-Sinai placed first in California and Los Angeles, and was nationally ranked in 11 adult specialties. The hospital was rated high-performing in 20 adult procedures and conditions. Newsweek and Statista recognized Cedars-Sinai as 34th globally in their 2025 World’s Best Hospitals ranking.

Adult specialties (2025)	U.S. News & World Report national rankings
Gastroenterology and GI surgery	2
Orthopaedics	5
Pulmonology and lung surgery	5
Cardiology heart and vascular surgery	6
Obstetrics and gynecology	8
Diabetes and endocrinology	9
Geriatrics	16
Cancer	18
Neurology and neurosurgery	18
Urology	33
Ear, nose, and throat (otolaryngology)	38

== Research ==
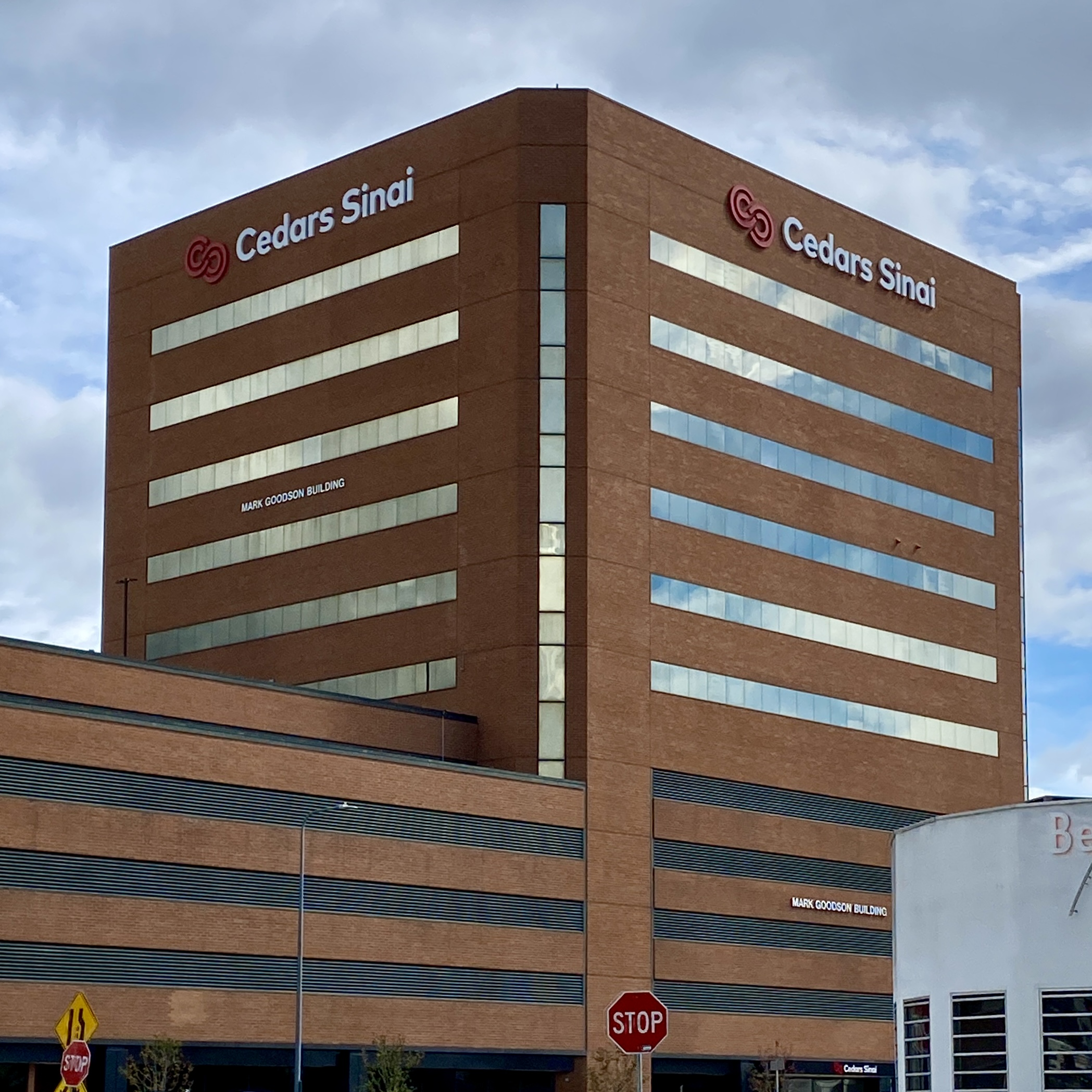
Cedars-Sinai Los Angeles, Mark Goodson Building (2024)

Cedars-Sinai Medical Center was the site of the first open-heart surgery in 1955, the discovery of Prinzmetal angina, and the development of the Swan-Ganz catheter.

Cedars-Sinai was a finalist in the 2015 Innovation By Design Awards from Fast Company for its OR 360 simulation center. The OR 360 trains doctors and nurses for trauma care during the first hour after a patient is admitted and is designed to simulate a variety of trauma scenarios.

In July 2022, Cedars-Sinai Medical Center scientists sent reprogrammed stem cells to the International Space Station to study growth in zero gravity. Funded by NASA, the experiment compared these cells to a control group on Earth over four weeks.

In 2024, Cedars-Sinai Technology Ventures generated over $1 billion in five years. As of that time, it had overseen 500 technologies and 1,100 patents in biotech, medtech and digital health. Prometheus Biosciences, the developer of therapeutic treatments for inflammatory bowel disease, is a spinoff of Cedars-Sinai Technology Ventures.

Cedars-Sinai developed an AI-powered virtual reality mental health tool named Xaia to assist patients with chronic pain and other illnesses. By July 2025, about 300 patients had participated in related research studies.

== Cedars-Sinai Graduate School of Biomedical Sciences ==
The Cedars-Sinai Graduate School of Biomedical Sciences (formerly known as Cedars-Sinai's Graduate Research Education division), established in 2008, is a graduate college at Cedars-Sinai Medical Center. It offers PhD and Master's programs in Biomedical Sciences and healthcare fields. There are more than 100 faculty, and over 150 enrollment; the Dean is Shlomo Melmed.

The school offers programs at the Master's and Doctoral levels.

PhD Program:

- Biomedical Sciences

Master's Programs:

- Magnetic Resonance in Medicine
- Health Delivery Science
- Regenerative Medicine

Professional Training Programs:

- Postdoctoral Scientist Program
- Clinical Scholars Program
- Research Internship Program

== Notable staff ==
- Keith Black, Chair of the Department of Neurosurgery and Director of the Maxine Dunitz Neurosurgical Institute, has performed over 4,000 brain surgeries and has made significant medical advances relating to neurosurgery.
- George Berci, oldest surgeon
- Bruce Gewertz, Surgeon-in-Chief, Chair of the Department of Surgery, Vice-Dean for Academic Affairs and Vice-President for Interventional Services.
- Elsie Giorgi, former head of clinics
- David Ho was a resident at Cedars-Sinai when he encountered some of the first cases of what was later labeled AIDS.
- Calvin Johnson, Professor of Anesthesiology
- Verne Mason, internist and chairman of the Howard Hughes Medical Institute's medical advisory committee. Mason gave the disease sickle cell anemia its name.
- Jason H. Moore, Chair of the Department of Computational Biomedicine and Director of the Center for Artificial Intelligence Research and Education (CAIRE)
- David Rimoin, chair of Pediatrics for 18 years, specialized in genetics and was a pioneer researcher in dwarfism and skeletal dysplasia. Together with Michael Kaback, he discovered the enzyme screening for Tay–Sachs disease, reducing the incidence of the deadly disease by 90 percent.
- Karine Sargsyan, physician, geneticist, and foresight scientist
- William Shell was a director of Cardiac Rehabilitation at Cedars-Sinai.
- Esther Somerfeld-Ziskind, a neurologist and psychiatrist who was chair of the Department of Psychiatry.
- Adam Springfield, who acted on the PBS series Wishbone, is now a Labor and Delivery scheduler.
- Jeremy Swan co-invented the pulmonary artery catheter together with William Ganz while at Cedars-Sinai.
- Nicholas Tatonetti, associate director of computational oncology in the cancer center.
- Neal ElAttrache, orthopedic surgeon

== Investigations ==
=== Quaid twins overdose ===
In 2008, the twin daughters of actor Dennis Quaid were born prematurely and cared for at Cedars. They were accidentally given the wrong version of the blood thinner heparin, which had 1000 times the strength of the version intended. The twins survived.

The news was leaked to the website TMZ, which published it before Quaid's extended family learned of it. The hospital promised an investigation into the leak.

The California Department of Health Services investigated and cited failures "to adhere to established policies & procedures for safe medication use." The resulting malpractice claim was settled out of court, and included a commitment by Cedars to introduce electronic record keeping, bedside bar coding and computerized physician-order entry systems to improve patient safety. The hospital also implemented additional procedures for pharmacy and nursing staff.

=== Excess radiation during CT scans ===
From 2008 to 2009, 260 patients received excess radiation during CT brain perfusion scans, with the error discovered after a patient reported hair loss. The FDA and California Department of Public Health launched investigations, and Cedars-Sinai implemented stricter protocols and provided care and apologies to affected patients.

== Art collection ==
First developed by philanthropists Frederick and Marcia Weisman, Cedars-Sinai's modern and contemporary art collection dates to 1976 and includes more than 4,000 original paintings, sculptures, new media installations and limited-edition prints by the likes of Andy Warhol, Robert Rauschenberg, Richard Diebenkorn, Sam Francis, Claes Oldenburg, Willem de Kooning, Raymond Pettibon and Pablo Picasso. At any given time, 90 to 95 percent of the collection is on display. Nine large-scale works are located in courtyards, parking lots, and public walkways throughout the approximately 30-acre campus. The collection consists entirely of gifts from donors, other institutions, and occasionally the artists themselves.

The mural "Jewish Contributions to Medicine", by Terry Schoonhoven, can be seen in the Harvey Morse Auditorium.
