= William Shell =

American cardiologist and inventor

William Elson Shell, M.D. (September 8, 1942 – March 28, 2017) was an American cardiologist and inventor of several questionable weight-loss products which were cited for false advertising by the Federal Trade Commission. He owned several U.S. patents. Shell was banned from the securities industry for life as a result of a federal SEC conviction (see below).

== Career ==
Shell was a graduate of the University of Michigan Medical School. After medical school, he completed an internship and residency at University Hospital in Ann Arbor, Michigan. He then completed a three-year fellowship in cardiovascular medicine under Eugene Braunwald at the University of California, San Diego. He then served two years as the Chief of the Coronary Care Unit at Keesler Air Force Base. Shell was first certified in cardiovascular disease and internal medicine by the American Board of Internal Medicine in 1974. He was the founder, former chairman of the board, CEO and chief scientific officer at Targeted Medical Pharma, Inc., a Los Angeles-based specialty pharmaceutical company that develops and distributes medical food products.

Shell led the team that discovered the cardio specific enzyme CK-MB.

From 1982 to 1995, Shell was a member of the cardiology staff at Cedars of Lebanon Hospital and Mount Sinai Hospital. During his tenure, he planned, directed and implemented the merger of the coronary care unit at Cedars of Lebanon and Mount Sinai Hospital into what is now known as Cedars-Sinai Medical Center in Los Angeles, California. He also directed the Cardiac Cath Lab and Cardiac Rehabilitation Center at Cedar-Sinai Medical Center. Dr. Shell was also director of the Cardiac Catheterization Laboratory and director of Cardiac Rehabilitation. He was a member of the research team at the Myocardial Infarction Research Unit, a $5 million per year research grant from the National Institutes of Health. Under that program, he was a national leader in the definitions and recognition of silent heart disease. He also published seminal papers of the implication of prostaglandins in heart disease. In addition, he participated in the planning, funding and administration of NIH grants and managed a biochemistry research laboratory at Cedars-Sinai Medical Center. Ultimately, he left Cedars-Sinai Medical Center in a patent dispute to enter private practice in Beverly Hills. He was a founder in Beverly Glen Medical Systems that developed techniques for transtelephonic monitoring of cardiac rhythm disturbances and autonomic nervous system function using 24-hour electrocardiographic recordings for which he published the first American paper on prolapsed mitral valve syndrome. In 1967, he was the first American physician on the American Soviet Exchange Program for which he received a presidential citation from President Richard Nixon, one of the only presidential citations given to an American physician. He has published numerous peer reviewed articles in significant medical journals. He has been granted 27 American patents on various aspects of cardiovascular disease and has more than 12 new patent applications pending at the U.S. Patent Office.

In 2012 and 2014, Shell published new data in the American Journal of Therapeutics regarding the nutritional management of pain using the amino acid-based medical food Theramine, along with new data regarding the nutritional management of sleep disorders and the nutritional management of PTSD.

== Commercial activity ==
As an entrepreneur, Shell developed multiple patents for Targeted Medical Pharma governing the processes involved in amino acid based medical food products. Dr. Shell, the former CEO of Physician Therapeutics, created the following products: Theracodophen-650 Convenience Pack (Hydrocodone 10 mg, Acetaminophen 650 mg, and Theramine); Strazepam Convenience Pack (Temazepam 15 mg and Sentra PM); Gabazolamine-0.5 Convenience Pack (Alprazolam 0.5 mg and GABAdone); Gaboxetine Convenience Pack (Fluoxetine 10 mg and GABAdone); Trazamine Convenience Pack (Tradazone 50 mg and Sentra PM); Senophylline Convenience Pack (Theophylline 100 mg and Sentra PM); Therapentin-60 (Gabapentin 200 mg and Theramine); Prazolamine (Carisoprodol 350 mg and Theramine); Sentradine (Ranitidine 150 mg and Sentra PM); and Therafeldamine (Piroxicam 20 mg and Theramine) Dr. Shell successfully defended these products listed in the warning letter and subsequently worked with FDA to register these products in their database as well as the NIH Dailymed database. Previous products include the Fat Magnet (Lipitrol), a product that uses cellulose to trap fat and bind with it. Fat Magnet was banned from making and advertising false claims by the Federal Trade Commission.

Targeted Medical Pharma was a promotion traded on the "pink sheets" and went to zero.

Shell also formulated SeQuester, a pill which he promoted as a "natural nutritional fat sequestrant". SeQuester added bile to the fibrous matter, claiming to trap fat and allow it to pass through the digestive system without being absorbed by the body. The Federal Trade Commission also banned SeQuester from making and advertising false claims.

== Federal conviction and lifetime ban from the securities industry ==
In 1991, Dr. Shell founded and served as chairman and chief executive officer of SeeShell Biotechnology, a company he started with Dr Jackie Ray See, a Fullerton California doctor, which merged with a company called Interactive Principals, which in turn merged into Interactive Medical Technologies Ltd ("IMT"), whose stock was quoted on the Over the Counter Bulletin Board (the so-called "pink sheets"). Dr. Shell relinquished the daily CEO role and retained the title of chairman of the board of directors until 1995. Shell and Clark Martin "Buzz" Holcomb, a Westlake Village California promoter, were sued by the Securities and Exchange Commission for an illegal unregistered distribution of IMT shares. Both Shell and Holcomb were convicted and permanently barred from the U.S. securities industry as a result, and Shell was additionally fined $35,000. Shell and Holcomb were prosecuted by SEC Enforcement Division prosecutors Alan Rubinstein and Jason Sabot, assisted by SEC Enforcement Division investigator Stanley Skubina. The enforcement action was agreed and signed on August 13, 1997. IMT signed a consent decree in June 1997.
