= Patricia A. Ganz =

American medical oncologist

- Born: Los Angeles, California
- Spouse: Tomas Ganz (m. 1970)

Academic background
- Education: BA, 1969, Radcliffe College; MD, 1973, David Geffen School of Medicine at UCLA

Academic work
- Institutions: David Geffen School of Medicine at UCLA; UCLA Fielding School of Public Health; Jonsson Comprehensive Cancer Center

Patricia Anne Ganz (nee Conn) is an American medical oncologist. She is a professor of health policy and management in the Fielding School of Public Health and a professor of medicine in the David Geffen School of Medicine at UCLA. In 2007, she was elected to the Institute of Medicine.

== Early life and education ==
Ganz was born in Los Angeles, California and raised in Beverly Hills, California as the oldest child to a physician father and homemaker mother. She was encouraged by her father to pursue a career in medicine and she completed clerical work for her father's medical practice during the summer season. Following her graduation from Radcliffe College, she married Tomas Ganz in 1970 and began her medical training at the David Geffen School of Medicine at UCLA. Her father told her that "medicine wasn't such a bad career for a woman" and she was one of three women in a class of 120 at UCLA.

== Career ==
Upon completing her medical degree, Ganz trained as an internist and medical oncologist at UCLA Medical Center. In 1978 she took a faculty position at the UCLA-San Fernando Valley Program and established an oncology unit at the Sepulveda VA Medical Center to provide palliative care to patients from diagnosis until death. In 1986, she also became a founding member of the National Coalition for Cancer Survivorship and was one of the first medical professionals to recognize that the effects of surviving cancer could stay long term with the patient. Working with colleagues at the VAMC and UCLA, she began a series of research studies examining the impact of cancer and its treatment on the quality of life of patients. In 1986, she was a founding member of the National Coalition for Cancer Survivorship (NCCS), the first major cancer advocacy organization to advance the needs and concerns of the growing number of cancer survivors. As a result of her experience and academic accomplishments, she was chosen to participate in the National Breast Cancer Prevention Trial, a study to determine if Tamoxifen could prevent breast cancer.

In 1992, Ganz returned to UCLA full-time as a Professor in the UCLA Schools of Medicine and Public Health, as well as the Jonsson Comprehensive Cancer Center (JCCC), where she was recruited to be the associate director of the Division of Cancer Control. In this role, she would serve in the School of Public Health and co-lead research within JCCC in its Population Science Group. However, within a year of joining the faculty, she was promoted to Director following the departure of Ellen Gritz. As she continued her research into health-related quality of life and the long term effects breast cancer has on women's mental health, Ganz received one of 10 Avon Breast Cancer Leadership Awards to fund research on how breast cancer affects the lives of women. At the JCCC, she established the UCLA Family Cancer Registry and Genetic Evaluation Program in 1997, which serves patients and survivors, as well as those at high risk for familial/hereditary cancers. As a result, Ganz also became the first woman to receive the American Cancer Society's Clinical Research Professorship, which included $300,000 over five years to support her research of women at high risk for breast cancer, quality of life among cancer survivors, and genetic links to the disease. Her efforts were also recognized in 2005 by the Breast Cancer Research Foundation with the Jill Rose Award, an honor given to top cancer scientists. She was honored for her “extraordinary research accomplishments which have changed the way doctors and patients deal with the physical and psychological quality of life issues that follow breast cancer treatment."

In 2006, Ganz founded one of eight centers established by the Lance Armstrong Foundation; the University of California, Los Angeles-Livestrong Survivorship Center of Excellence. The following year, she was elected to the Institute of Medicine. In 2010, Ganz received the American Cancer Society's Medal of Honor for "the clinical research she’s done as director of cancer prevention and control research at UCLA’s Jonsson Comprehensive Cancer Center." She continued her research in the subject of quality of care at UCLA and she chaired the committee that produced the 2013 Institute of Medicine report Delivering High-Quality Cancer Care: Charting a Course for a System in Crisis. In the same year, she was also the lead author of a study which showed that patient-reported cognitive difficulties could be associated with neuropsychological test performance, and received the European Institute of Oncology Breast Cancer Therapy Award. On July 1, 2017, Ganz was appointed the editor-in-chief of the Journal of the National Cancer Institute (JNCI), replacing Carmen Allegra. At the time of her appointment, Ganz said she was the first JNCI editor-in-chief without an NCI pedigree.
