= Jeremy Swan =

Irish cardiologist

- Born: June 1, 1922; Sligo, Ireland
- Died: February 7, 2005 (aged 82); Los Angeles, California

Harold James Charles “Jeremy” Swan (1 June 1922 – 7 February 2005) was an Irish cardiologist who co-invented the Swan-Ganz catheter with William Ganz at Cedars-Sinai Medical Center in 1970.

== Early life and education ==
Swan was born on 1 June 1922 in Sligo Ireland. His parents were both physicians, Harold John Swan and Marcella Bertile Swan née Kelly. His mother called him "Jeremy" to limit confusion and the name stuck throughout his life. Swan's early education was at Castle Rock School. He then attended St. Vincent's Castleknock College in Dublin and graduated in 1939. He attended medical school at Trinity College Dublin in Dublin but earned his degree from St. Thomas's Hospital, London, England graduating in 1945. Swan was also an intern and junior resident at St. Thomas's Hospital from 1945 to 1946. He then entered the Royal Air Force medical service from 1946 to 1948, being stationed in Iraq.

== Career ==
Swan worked as a cardiologist in the Mayo Clinic (in Rochester, Minnesota), and later moved to Cedars Sinai Hospital (Los Angeles). His description of the invention of the catheter is said to have derived from watching the wind playing with sails in Santa Monica. He was present at the Mayo around the time they were performing early open heart surgeries in the mid-1950s.

== Personal life and death ==
Swan died on 7 February 2005 from complications following a heart attack after a long period of debilitation from a stroke that he suffered from in 2001.

== Award and honors ==
- Fellow American College of Cardiology (ACC) - 1968
- Member of the executive committee of the ACC - 1971
- Member of the Los Angeles County Heart Association Board of Directors - 1966–1972
- Chairman of the Research Committee Los Angeles County Heart Association - 1967–1969
- Fellow American College of Physicians (ACP) - 1970
- President ACC - 1973 and 1974
- Chairman of the Bethesda Conference Committee ACC - 1984–1989
- ACC Distinguished Fellow - 1985
- ACC Distinguished Service - 1999
- ACC master of the college - 2001
- ACC Distinguished Scientist - 2003
- Master of the American College of Physicians - 1985
- Honorary doctorate from Trinity College in Dublin - 1996
- Walter Dixon Memorial Award from the British Medical Association
- Herrick Award for Outstanding Achievement in Clinical Cardiology from the American Heart Association
- Maimonides Award from the state of Israel
- Theodore Cummings Humanitarian Award from Cedars-Sinai
