= Transfusion therapy (Sickle-cell disease) =

Red blood cells (erythrocytes) from donors contain normal hemoglobin (HbA), and transfusion of normal red blood cells into people with sickle cell disease reduces the percentage of red cells in the circulation containing the abnormal hemoglobin (HbS). Although transfusion of donor red blood cells can ameliorate and even prevent complications of sickle cell disease in certain circumstances, transfusion therapy is not universally beneficial in sickle cell disease.

== Types of transfusion therapy ==
There are two main types of transfusion, simple red cell transfusion and exchange transfusion.

=== Simple transfusion ===
Involves transfusing red blood cells without removing any of the patient's blood. It is used when the patient's hemoglobin is much lower than normal, for example an aplastic crisis.

=== Exchange transfusion ===
Exchange transfusion involves removal of the patient's blood and replacement with donor red blood cells. It is used to treat life-threatening complications of sickle cell disease such as stroke or acute chest crisis.

There are three main benefits of an exchange transfusion compared to a simple transfusion, these relate primarily to the ability to remove hemoglobin S containing red blood cells:

1. Higher percentage of normal (donor) hemoglobin (HbA) containing red cells after the transfusion
2. Larger volumes of donor blood can be given without increasing the hematocrit to levels that excessively increase blood viscosity
3. Reduced net transfused volume of red blood cells, which reduces iron overload.

However, there are also potential risks associated with an exchange transfusion:

1. Red cell alloimmunization due to increased donor exposure
2. Higher costs
3. Need for specialized equipment
4. Need for good venous access.

==== Automated red cell exchange ====
The exchange is performed using a machine (pheresis). This method rapidly and substantially reduces the concentration of sickle cells within the blood without increasing the overall hematocrit or blood viscosity.

==== Manual red cell exchange ====
The exchange is performed manually. It refers to manually phlebotomizing a percentage of the patient's blood prior to or concomitantly with giving a red cell transfusion.

=== Frequency of red cell transfusions ===
Red cell transfusions can be further classified as episodic or chronic.

==== Episodic transfusion ====
Episodic transfusion is used either acutely in response to a complication of sickle cell disease such as acute chest syndrome or to prevent complications prior to surgery.

==== Chronic transfusion ====
Chronic transfusion is used when sustained, low levels of HbS are needed to prevent sickle cell-related complications, most commonly stroke in children.

== Indications for red blood cell transfusion ==
Transfusion therapy for sickle-cell disease entails the use of red blood cell transfusions in the management of acute cases of sickle cell disease and as a prophylaxis to prevent complications by decreasing the number of red blood cells (RBC) that can sickle by adding normal red blood cells.

=== Prevention of complications ===
==== Stroke ====
In children prophylactic chronic red blood cell (RBC) transfusion therapy has been shown to be efficacious to a certain extent in reducing the risk of first stroke or silent stroke when transcranial Doppler (TCD) ultrasonography shows abnormal increased cerebral blood flow velocities. In those who have sustained a prior stoke event it also reduces the risk of recurrent stroke and additional silent strokes. There is no evidence for the use of red blood cell transfusion in adults to prevent primary stroke, although it is recommended to prevent secondary stroke.

==== Surgery ====
In children and adults red blood cell transfusion to increase the hemoglobin level to 100 g/L has been shown to decrease the risk of sickle cell-related complications. However, this has not been seen in all studies, and has only been demonstrated for African haplotypes of Hemoglobin SS.

==== Respiratory problems ====
In children who have been given transfusions to prevent stroke there was also a reduction in the number of children who developed acute chest crises. There is no evidence about whether or not red cell transfusions prevent chronic lung complications.

==== Pregnancy ====
There is a paucity of high-quality evidence which has led to conditional recommendations from American Society of Hematology for transfusional support in pregnant patients. Recent evidence suggests that patients with prior pregnancy complications, high hospitalization rates, or preterm deliveries may benefit from scheduled partial exchange transfusions.

=== Treatment of complications ===
==== Aplastic crisis ====
This should be suspected if there is a significant drop in the hemoglobin level compared to the patient's usual hemoglobin level which is associated with a low level of reticulocytes. This is usually due to infection with erythrovirus B19 (previously known as parvovirus B19). The anemia is usually severe with an average drop in hemoglobin of 40 g/L, and is usually treated with a simple transfusion.

==== Splenic and hepatic sequestration ====
Acute splenic and hepatic sequestration associated with severe anemia requires a simple transfusion to raise the hemoglobin.

==== Acute chest crisis ====
Red cell transfusions are used to treat patients with acute chest crisis and respiratory compromise. Exchange transfusion is recommended for those patients who have a higher hemoglobin (> 90g/L), those who have not improved after a simple transfusion, or those who have severe respiratory compromise.

== Complications related to red blood cell transfusion ==
=== Alloimmunisation ===
Red cell alloimmunisation is common in people with sickle cell disease who receive transfusions in Europe and North America. This is because there are ethnic differences in the frequencies of blood group antigens. Blood donors are usually Caucasian whereas the blood transfusion recipients usually have an African or Afro-Caribbean ancestry. Extended phenotype matching of red blood cells (matching Rh and Kell blood groups as well as ABO) decreases the risk of alloimmunisation, but it still occurs.

=== Iron overload ===
Each unit of transfused blood has approximately 250 mg of iron, with each successive transfusion, patients receiving chronic transfusion therapy accumulate iron in various tissues in the body as the body has no way to excrete the excess, this is a cause of increased morbidity and mortality. The effects of iron overload are countered by chelation therapy Guidelines recommend if patients are receiving regular or intermittent transfusions they should be monitored for iron overload.
