= Journal of the National Cancer Institute =

- Discipline: Oncology
- Language: English
- Edited by: Eduardo L. Franco

Publication details
- History: 1940–present
- Publisher: Oxford University Press (United States)
- Frequency: Monthly
- Impact factor: 7.2 (2024)

Standard abbreviations
- ISO 4: J. Natl. Cancer Inst.

Indexing
- CODEN: JNCIEQ
- ISSN: 0027-8874 (print); 1460-2105 (web)
- OCLC no.: 01064763

Links
- Journal homepage; Online access; Online archive

JNCI Monographs
- Discipline: Oncology
- Language: English
- Edited by: Dr. Eduardo L. Franco

Publication details
- History: 1959–present
- Publisher: Oxford University Press

Standard abbreviations
- ISO 4: JNCI Monogr.

Indexing
- ISSN: 1052-6773 (print); 1745-6614 (web)
- LCCN: 94660018
- OCLC no.: 21986096

Links
- Journal homepage; Online access; Online archive

The Journal of the National Cancer Institute (JNCI) is a peer-reviewed medical journal covering research in oncology that was established in August 1940. It is published monthly by Oxford University Press and is edited by Patricia A. Ganz. It was merged with Cancer Treatment Reports in January 1988. JNCI used to be the official journal of the U.S. National Cancer Institute (NCI); however, in 1996, the NCI and JNCI agreed to grow apart. Over the next five years, JNCI became independent of the NCI.

A related publication is Journal of the National Cancer Institute Monographs (JNCI Monographs), established in 1959, which publishes manuscripts from cancer and cancer-related conferences, as well as groups of papers on specific subjects related to cancer. In January 1986, Cancer Treatment Symposia was merged with JNCI Monographs. Additionally, JNCI Cancer Spectrum (JNCI CS) is a fully open access journal, which was established in 2017. It is published bimonthly by Oxford University Press and is edited by Ronald Chen.

== History ==
The history of JNCI is linked to that of several other journals. A full history of JNCI and JNCI Monographs is presented below.

- 1940: Journal of the National Cancer Institute (ISSN 0027-8874) established by the National Cancer Institute (NCI)
- 1959: National Cancer Institute Monograph (ISSN 0083-1921) established by the NCI
- 1959: Cancer Chemotherapy Reports (ISSN 0576-6559) founded by the Cancer Chemotherapy National Service Center (CCNSC)
- 1966: Cancer Chemotherapy Reports is taken over by the NCI
- 1968: Cancer Chemotherapy Reports is split into three parts: Cancer Chemotherapy Reports, Part 1 (ISSN 0069-0112), Cancer Chemotherapy Reports, Part 2 (ISSN 0069-0120) and Cancer Chemotherapy Reports, Part 3 (ISSN 0069-0139)
- 1976: The three parts of Cancer Chemotherapy Reports are merged with each other and renamed Cancer Treatment Reports (ISSN 0576-6559)
- 1983: Cancer Treatment Symposia (ISSN 0742-1761) established by the NCI
- 1986: Cancer Treatment Symposia merged with National Cancer Institute Monograph, which is renamed NCI Monographs (ISSN 0893-2751)
- 1988: Journal of the National Cancer Institute absorbs Cancer Treatment Reports
- 1990: NCI Monographs renamed Journal of the National Cancer Institute Monographs (ISSN 1052-6773)
- 1996: Oxford University Press starts to take over Journal of the National Cancer Institute and Journal of the National Cancer Institute Monographs over a period of roughly five years

== Abstracting and indexing ==
JNCI is indexed and abstracted in:

- Abstracts in Anthropology
- Abstracts on Hygiene and Communicable Diseases
- Agbiotech News and Information
- American Statistics Index
- Annals of Behavioral Medicine
- Biological Abstracts
- BIOSIS Previews
- CAB Abstracts
- CINAHL
- CSA Oncogenes and Growth Factor Abstracts
- Current Contents/Clinical Medicine
- Current Contents/Life Sciences
- Dairy Science Abstracts
- Derwent Drug File
- Elsevier BIOBASE – Current Awareness in Biological Sciences (CABS)
- Environmental Science and Pollution Management
- Excerpta Medica
- Food Science and Technology Abstracts
- Global Health
- Health & Safety Science Abstracts
- IDIS
- Index Medicus/MEDLINE/PubMed
- INIS Atomindex
- International Pharmaceutical Abstracts
- Nutrition Abstracts and Reviews
- Nutrition Research Newsletter
- Oncology information service
- Pharmacoeconomics and Outcome News
- Prous Science Integrity
- Reactions Weekly
- Review of Aromatic and Medicinal Plants
- Review of Medical and Veterinary Mycology
- Risk Abstracts
- Rural Development Abstracts
- Sage Race Relations Abstracts
- Science Citation Index
- Soybean Abstracts
- The Standard Periodical Directory
- Toxicology Abstracts
- Tropical Diseases Bulletin
- Weed Abstracts

According to the Journal Citation Reports, the journal has a 2024 impact factor of 7.2, ranking it 44th out of 326 journals in the category "Oncology".

JNCI Monographs is indexed and abstracted in

- Abstracts in Anthropology
- Abstracts on Hygiene and Communicable Diseases
- BIOSIS Previews
- CAB Abstracts
- CINAHL
- Excerpta Medica
- Nutrition Abstracts and Reviews
- Oncology information service
- Pharmacoeconomics and Outcome News
- Reactions Weekly
- The Standard Periodical Directory
