= Sarah Vasen =

American physician (1870–1944)

- Born: May 21, 1870; Quincy, Illinois, US
- Died: August 21, 1944 (aged 74); Glendale, California, US
- Occupation: Physician

Sarah Vasen (May 21, 1870 Quincy, Illinois – August 21, 1944 Glendale, California) was the first Jewish female physician specializing in gynecology and obstetrics to practice in Los Angeles.

== Education ==
Until age 16, Vasen attended public school in Quincy. After finishing her public school education, Vasen began studying with Dr. Melinda Knapheide-Germann. Knapheide-Germann was one of the first female doctors to practice medicine in Quincy. Vasen trained with Knapheide-Germann for the next two years.

In 1890, Vasen began studying medicine at the Keokuk College of Medicine. Keokuk was the first coeducation American medical college specializing in gynecology and obstetrics practices. She graduated on March 8, 1892, the first Jewish female graduate in the college history.

In 1897, Vasen enrolled in postgraduate training in obstetrics in Philadelphia. During this time, Vasen began a physician and then the superintendent at the Jewish Maternity House.

== Medical career ==
Upon graduation, she moved back to her hometown of Quincy, Illinois and in 1902 became attending gynecologist at Quincy's Blessing Hospital. Vasen had spent her life invested in the Jewish community, and in 1898 she accepted a position as a physician and superintendent at Philadelphia's Jewish Maternity Home.

In 1904, Vasen made the decision to move to California and there she continued her medical career. Upon arrival in California, she began working as a physician and supervisor at Kaspare Cohn Hospital. She was the second Jewish female to practice medicine in California. Vasen was the first Jewish female to hold a supervising position and a position as a physician at Kaspare Cohn. She was recognized publicly for her incredibly efficient and careful work at Kaspare Cohn.

Vasen enjoyed her work as an OBGYN and supervisor, but in 1910 she decided to take a different route. She opened a private maternity clinic which she ran successfully for many years. Vasen also spent much of her time volunteering her services to help the poor Jewish community. She was very active in the Jewish community and the Los Angeles community as a whole.

Vasen retired from her medical career in 1915, shortly after her marriage to Saul Frank.

=== Work in the Jewish community ===
Sarah Vasen was raised in a Jewish home and Jewish community. She devoted her medical career to the underprivileged in the Jewish community of Los Angeles, specifically the women and children. Vasen contributed a great deal to the Jewish community when she served as a physician and superintendent at Philadelphia's Jewish Maternity Home in the years following her graduation from medical school. The Jewish Maternity Home was a place for Jewish immigrants seeking medical care, but that were too poor to afford it anywhere else.

Sarah Vasen also devoted her time to the education of the Jewish community. She was a prominent figure in the Jewish religious school for children. Vasen, then residing in Glendale, took part in organizing a religious school for the children of the town's Jewish community.

== Personal life ==
Vasen was the only daughter of Gerson (George) Vasen and Catherine Eschner Vasen out of nine children. Originally residing in Illinois, Vasen moved to Philadelphia for a few brief years before relocating to Los Angeles in 1905.

Vasen became interested in obstetrics and gynecology at a very young age. Vasen was exposed to pregnancy and raising children because her mother had nine children. Women choosing a career in the medical field was uncommon at this time.

In 1911, Vasen met Saul Frank, a newly retired businessman. The couple married in 1915 and settled in Glendale. Frank died of a heart attack on August 24, 1924, Vasen never remarried.

Vasen died on August 21, 1944, from complications of a cerebral hemorrhage. She was buried in East Los Angeles in Home of Peace Memorial Park.
