= Verne Mason =

American internist and Howard Hughes associate

- Born: Verne Rheem Mason; August 8, 1889; Wapello, Iowa, U.S.
- Died: November 16, 1965 (aged 76); Miami, Florida, U.S.
- Occupation: Physician
- Known for: association with Howard Hughes
- Spouses: Lucy Meredith Ginn (m. 1921, divorced); Ruth Mary Meinardi

Verne Rheem Mason (August 8, 1889 – November 16, 1965) was an eminent American internist and associate of Howard Hughes. Mason was the chairman of the medical advisory committee of the Howard Hughes Medical Institute.

A veteran of both World War I and World War II, he was a colonel in the United States Army Medical Corps.

== Early years ==
Verne Rheem Mason was born at Wapello, Iowa, on August 8, 1889. Mason received a Bachelor of Science from the University of California, in 1911, and a Doctor of Medicine from Johns Hopkins University in 1915. He was a veteran of World War I. Mason married Lucy Meredith Ginn on August 17, 1921. When Mason was a medical resident at Hopkins in 1922 he gave the disease sickle cell anemia its name.

== Internist ==
When Columbia Pictures film director Frank Capra fell ill with a mysterious fever after completing It Happened One Night, chief Harry Cohn called in Mason to diagnose and treat Capra's illness. In 1938, Mason was one of the physicians called to attend to the General of the Armies John J. Pershing. Pershing was in a coma and in bad health. Mason made the medical report on General Pershing, who recovered and lived for 10 more years. When Howard Hughes lay near death in Los Angeles in 1946, following the crash of his experimental Hughes XF-11 plane, he summoned Mason and asked, "Am I going to live?" After Mason was unsure, Hughes relayed to him a "message to the Army," saying "The accident was caused by the rear half of the right propeller, which suddenly switched into reverse pitch position."

Verne Mason became the personal physician of Hughes.

== Final years ==
Mason was for many years a member of the medical faculty of the University of Southern California, a professor of clinical medicine, and an attending physician at Cedars of Lebanon Hospital. He was considered a leading internist and diagnostician. Highly decorated, he served in both World War I and World War II. Mason was chairman of the medical advisory committee of the Howard Hughes Medical Institute. He later divorced his first wife Lucy Meredith Ginn and married Ruth Mary Meinardi, the former wife of composer Hoagy Carmichael. Mason died on November 16, 1965, in Miami, Florida.
