= Elsie Giorgi =

American physician

Elsie A. Giorgi (c. 1911 – June 19, 1998) was an American physician who worked at Bellevue Hospital in New York City before moving to Cedars-Sinai Medical Center in Los Angeles.

== Life ==
Giorgi was born in The Bronx, New York City, to Italian immigrant parents; she was the youngest of ten siblings. After attending Hunter College on a scholarship, she worked for a trucking company for twelve years before she could afford the tuition fees to attend the Columbia University College of Physicians and Surgeons. She graduated from Columbia in 1949.

Giorgi began her career at Bellevue Hospital where she spent ten years rising from an intern to chief of clinics, while also running a private practice in Manhattan and working at a clinic in East Harlem. She relocated to Los Angeles in 1961 for a psychiatry residency at Cedars-Sinai Medical Center, running the center's clinic and setting up a home-care program. In 1967, she established Watts Health Center, a free clinic funded by the Office of Economic Opportunity, in the low-income neighborhood of Watts after she was "appalled" by the health of local children whom she had volunteered to examine as part of the Head Start program. She also ran a private practice in Beverly Hills which served a wealthy clientele including numerous celebrities. She was a medical adviser on the 1991 film The Doctor and the television series Diagnosis: Murder.

Giorgi never married; she once told a reporter, "I am Italian, so that means Italian men who want a docile wife and lots of babies. Do you see any trace of a docile person in my eyes?" She died in Los Angeles in 1998 from a heart attack.
