= Silent stroke =

Stroke with no outward symptoms associated with stroke

- Specialty: Neurology

A silent stroke (or asymptomatic cerebral infarction) is a stroke that does not have any outward symptoms associated with stroke, and the patient is typically unaware they have suffered a stroke. Despite not causing identifiable symptoms, a silent stroke still causes damage to the brain and places the patient at increased risk for both transient ischemic attack and major stroke in the future. In a broad study in 1998, more than 11 million people were estimated to have experienced a stroke in the United States. Approximately 770,000 of these strokes were symptomatic and 11 million were first-ever silent MRI infarcts or hemorrhages. Silent strokes typically cause lesions which are detected via the use of neuroimaging such as MRI. The risk of silent stroke increases with age but may also affect younger adults. Women appear to be at increased risk for silent stroke, with hypertension and current cigarette smoking being amongst the predisposing factors.

These types of strokes include lacunar and other ischemic strokes and minor hemorrhages. They may also include leukoaraiosis (changes in the white matter of the brain): the white matter is more susceptible to vascular blockage due to reduced amount of blood vessels as compared to the cerebral cortex. These strokes are termed "silent" because they typically affect "silent" regions of the brain that do not cause a noticeable change in an afflicted person's motor functions such as contralateral paralysis, slurred speech, pain, or an alteration in the sense of touch. A silent stroke typically affects regions of the brain associated with various thought processes, mood regulation and cognitive functions and is a leading cause of vascular cognitive impairment and may also lead to a loss of urinary bladder control.

In the Cardiovascular Health Study, a population study conducted among 3,660 adults over the age of 65, 31% showed evidence of silent stroke in neuroimaging studies utilizing MRI. These individuals were unaware they had suffered a stroke. It is estimated that silent strokes are five times more common than symptomatic stroke.

A silent stroke differs from a transient ischemic attack (TIA). In TIA, symptoms of stroke are exhibited which may last from a few minutes to 24 hours before resolving. A TIA is a risk factor for having a major stroke and subsequent silent strokes in the future.

== Types ==
- Ischemic stroke: occurs when a blood vessel supplying blood to the brain becomes blocked. This type of stroke accounts for approximately 87 percent of all stroke cases.
- Hemorrhagic stroke: occurs when a blood vessel supplying blood to the brain becomes weakened and ruptures. Typically hemorrhagic stroke is caused by two types of weakened blood vessel: aneurysms and arteriovenous malformations (AVMs).
- Lacunar infarcts (LACI) are small (0.2 to 15 mm in diameter) noncortical (does not affect cerebral cortex) infarcts caused by the occlusion of a single penetrating branch of a larger blood vessel that provides blood to the brain's deep structures including the white matter. LACIs are strongly associated with the development of white matter lesions (WML) which can be detected via the use of computerized tomography (CT scans).

== Risk factors ==
There are various individual risk factors associated with having a silent stroke. Many of these risk factors are the same as those associated with having a major symptomatic stroke.

- Acrolein: elevated levels of acrolein, a toxic metabolite produced from the polyamines spermine, spermidine and by amine oxidase serve as a marker for silent stroke, when elevated in conjunction with C-reactive protein and interleukin 6 the confidence levels in predicting a silent stroke risk increase.
- Adiponectin: is a type of protein secreted by adipose cells that improves insulin sensitivity and possesses antiatherogenic properties. Lower levels of s-adiponectin are associated with ischemic stroke.
- Aging: the prevalence of silent stroke rises with increasing age with a prevalence rate of over twenty percent of the elderly increasing to 30%-40% in those over the age of 70.
- Anemia: children with acute anemia caused by medical conditions other than sickle cell anemia with hemoglobin below 5.5 g/dL. are at increased risk for having a silent stroke according to a study released at American Stroke Association's International Stroke Conference 2011. The researchers suggested a thorough examination for evidence of silent stroke in all severely anemic children in order to facilitate timely intervention to ameliorate the potential brain damage.
  - Sickle cell anemia: is an autosomal recessive genetic blood disorder caused in the gene (HBB gene) which codes for hemoglobin (Hg) and results in lowered levels. The blood cells in sickle cell disease are abnormally shaped (sickle-shaped) and may form clots or block blood vessels. Estimates of children with sickle cell anemia who suffer strokes (with silent strokes predominating in the younger patients) range from 15%-30%. These children are at significant risk of cognitive impairment and poor educational outcomes.
  - Thalassemia major: is an autosomal recessive genetically inherited form of hemolytic anemia, characterized by red blood cell (hemoglobin) production abnormalities. Children with this disorder are at increased risk for silent stroke.
- Atrial fibrillation (AF): atrial fibrillation (irregular heartbeat) is associated with a doubled risk for silent stroke.
- Cigarette smoking: The procoagulant and atherogenic effects of smoking increase the risk for silent stroke. Smoking also has a deleterious effect on regional cerebral blood flow (rCBF). The chances of having a stroke increase with the amount of cigarettes smoked and the length of time an individual has smoked (pack years).
- C-reactive protein (CRP) and Interleukin 6 (IL6): C-reactive protein is one of the plasma proteins known as acute phase proteins (proteins whose plasma concentrations increase (or decrease) by 25% or more during inflammatory disorders) which is produced by the liver. The level of CRP rises in response to inflammation in various parts of the body including vascular inflammation. The level of CRP can rise as high as 1000-fold in response to inflammation. Other conditions that can cause marked changes in CRP levels include infection, trauma, surgery, burns, inflammatory conditions, and advanced cancer. Moderate changes can also occur after strenuous exercise, heatstroke, and childbirth. Increased levels of CRP as measured by a CRP test or the more sensitive high serum CRP (hsCRP) test have a close correlation to increased risk of silent stroke. Interleukin-6 is an interleukin (type of protein) produced by T-cells (specialized white blood cells), macrophages and endothelial cells. IL6 is also classified as a cytokine (acts in relaying information between cells). IL6 is involved in the regulation of the acute phase response to injury and infection may act as both an anti-inflammatory agent and a pro-inflammatory. Increased levels of CRP as measured by a CRP test or the more sensitive high serum CRP (hsCRP) test and elevated levels of I6 as measured by an IL6 ELISA are markers for the increased risk of silent stroke.
- Diabetes mellitus: untreated or improperly managed diabetes mellitus is associated with an increased risk for silent stroke.
- Hypertension: which affects up to 50 million people in the United States alone is the major treatable risk factor associated with silent strokes.
- Homocysteine: elevated levels of total homocysteine (tHcy) an amino acid are an independent risk factor for silent stroke, even in healthy middle-aged adults.
- Metabolic syndrome (MetS):Metabolic syndrome is a name for a group of risk factors that occur together and increase the risk for coronary artery disease, stroke, and type 2 diabetes. A higher number of these MetS risk factors the greater the chance of having a silent stroke.
  - Polyendocrine metabolic ovarian syndrome (PMOS): is associated with double the risk for arterial disease including silent stroke independent of the subjects Body mass index (BMI).
- Sleep apnea: encompasses a heterogeneous group of sleep-related breathing disorders in which there is repeated intermittent episodes of breathing cessation or hypopnea, when breathing is shallower or slower than normal. Sleep apnea is a common finding in stroke patients but recent research suggests that it is even more prevalent in silent stroke and chronic microvascular changes in the brain. In the study presented at the American Stroke Association's International Stroke Conference 2012 the higher the apnea-hypopnea index, the more likely patients had a silent stroke.

== Neuropsychological deficits ==
Individuals who have had silent strokes often have various neuropsychological deficits and have significant impairment in multiple areas of cognitive performance. One study has shown an association between silent stroke and a history of memory loss and lower scores on tests of cognitive function. In a second study, individuals who have had a silent stroke scored lower on the mini–mental state examination (MMSE) and on Raven's Colored Progressive Matrices—a test designed for children aged 5 through 11 years, mentally and physically impaired individuals, and elderly people.

=== In children ===
Children who have suffered silent strokes often have a variety of neuropsychological deficits. These deficits may include lowered I.Q., learning disabilities, and an inability to focus.

Silent strokes are the most common form of neurologic injury in children with sickle cell anemia, who may develop subtle neurocognitive deficits in the areas of attention and concentration, executive function, and visual-motor speed and coordination due to silent strokes which may not have been detected on physical examination.

=== Link to depression ===
Major depression is a risk factor and also a consequence of silent brain infarction (SBI). Persons who present with symptoms of presenile and senile major depression showed a markedly higher incidence of SBI (65.9% and 93.7%). Individuals with major depression who have had an SBI present with more marked neurological deficits and more severe depressive symptoms than do those without SBI.

== Diagnosis ==
The diagnosis of a silent stroke is usually made as an incidental finding (by chance) of various neuroimaging techniques. Silent strokes may be detected by:

- Magnetic resonance imaging (MRI)
- Computed tomography (CT scan)
- Transcranial Doppler ultrasonography (TCD), which measures cerebral blood flow velocity (CBFV) in the large intracranial arteries in the brain, has been shown in various studies to be an effective tool to diagnose children with sickle cell anemia at increased risk of having an initial or recurrent silent stroke. The narrowing of these arteries which is a risk factor for cerebral infarction, is characterized by an increased velocity of blood flow.

== Prevention ==
Preventive measures that can be taken to avoid sustaining a silent stroke are the same as for stroke. Smoking cessation is the most immediate step that can be taken, with the effective management of hypertension the major medically treatable factor.

=== Sickle cell anemia ===
Transfusion therapy lowers the risk for a new silent stroke in children who have both abnormal cerebral artery blood flow velocity, as detected by transcranial Doppler, and previous silent infarct, even when the initial MRI showed no abnormality. A finding of elevated TCD ultrasonographic velocity warrants MRI of the brain, as those with both abnormalities who are not provided transfusion therapy are at higher risk for developing a new silent infarct or stroke than are those whose initial MRI showed no abnormality.

== See also ==
- Stroke
- Hypertension
- Cerebral hypoxia
- DASH diet (Dietary Approaches to Stop Hypertension)
