= Theramine =

Type of medical food

Theramine is an amino acid based medical food indicated for the dietary management of pain and inflammatory disorders. Theramine is manufactured by Physician Therapeutics, a division of Targeted Medical Pharma (OTC:TRGM). Theramine has been the subject of two double-blind clinical trials for low-back pain.
