= Tomas Ganz =

American physician-scientist

Tomas Ganz is an American physician-scientist who has made important contributions to innate immunology and the pathophysiology of iron regulation. He was born in Prague, Czechoslovakia (now the Czech Republic) in 1948, and immigrated to the United States in 1966. He studied physics at University of California, Los Angeles (UCLA) (B.S. 1970) and obtained a Ph.D. in Applied Physics from the California Institute of Technology in 1976 and an M.D. from the University of California, Los Angeles (UCLA) in 1978. In 1983, after receiving training in pulmonology and internal medicine, he became a faculty member at UCLA in the department of medicine. Later he received a joint appointment in the graduate program in cellular and molecular pathology. He has studied the role of small peptide mediators in human physiology and disease. In 2005, he received the Marcel Simon Prize of the International Bioiron Society for the discovery of the iron-regulatory hormone hepcidin and in 2014 was honored by the E. Donnall Thomas Award from the American Society of Hematology "... for his groundbreaking research in iron homeostasis, including the discovery of the iron-regulatory hormone hepcidin and investigation of its roles in iron metabolism". He is also credited with the discovery erythroferrone, the hormone produced by red cell precursors in the marrow to maintain the iron supply for the production of red cells. In 2025, he received the Landsteiner-Alter Award of the Association for Advancement of Blood and Biotherapies: “In recognition of extraordinary achievements throughout a field-advancing career. Dr. Ganz’s research has been instrumental in expanding knowledge of innate immunity and iron metabolism." He lists more than 400 publications with a Google H-index of 179 (October 2026). He is a Distinguished Professor of Medicine and Pathology Emeritus on recall for research at the David Geffen School of Medicine at UCLA.
