= Insufficiency =

Insufficiency may refer to:

== Medical conditions ==
=== Circulatory system ===
- Aortic insufficiency (AI), also known as aortic regurgitation (AR), the leaking of the aortic valve of the heart that causes blood to flow in reverse during ventricular diastole, from the aorta into the left ventricle
- Arterial insufficiency, insufficient blood flow through the arteries typically caused by atherosclerosis
  - Arterial insufficiency ulcer (also known as "Ischemic ulcers"), mostly located on the lateral surface of the ankle or the distal digits
- Chronic venous insufficiency or CVI is a medical condition where the leg veins cannot pump enough oxygen-poor blood back to the heart
  - Venous insufficiency ulceration, as well as stasis dermatitis, a skin condition that results from increased pressure in the venous system of the lower leg
- Placental insufficiency, insufficient blood flow to the placenta during pregnancy
- Pulmonary valve insufficiency (or incompetence, or regurgitation) is a condition where the pulmonary valve is not strong enough to prevent backflow into the right ventricle
- Tricuspid insufficiency, a valvular heart disease also called Tricuspid regurgitation, refers to the failure of the heart's tricuspid valve to close properly during systole
- Vertebrobasilar insufficiency (VBI), or vertebral basilar ischemia, a temporary set of symptoms due to decreased blood flow in the posterior circulation of the brain

=== Endocrine system ===
- Adrenal insufficiency, a condition in which the adrenal glands, located above the kidneys, do not produce adequate amounts of steroid hormones
  - Critical illness–related corticosteroid insufficiency, a form of adrenal insufficiency in critically ill patients whose blood corticosteroid levels are inadequate for the stress response they experience

=== Nervous system ===
- Accommodative insufficiency (AI), the inability of the eye to focus properly on an object
- Convergence insufficiency, a sensory and neuromuscular anomaly of the binocular vision system, characterized by an inability of the eyes to approach each other, or sustain convergence

=== Other medical conditions ===
- Exocrine pancreatic insufficiency (EPI), the inability to properly digest food due to a lack of digestive enzymes made by the pancreas

== Other uses ==
- Motion triggered contact insufficiency (MTCI), the effect of increased contact resistance occurring during or after mechanical stress or movement of an electrical contact system
