= Sofas =

Sofas may refer to:

- Couch (plural), furniture for seating several persons
- SOFA score (sequential organ failure assessment score), summarizes a patient's organ health or rate of failure within an intensive care unit (ICU)
- Solid fats and added sugars (SoFAS), a dietary education project of the U.S. Department of Agriculture
