= Emanuel Rivers =

American physician

Emanuel Rivers is a physician born and raised in River Rouge, Michigan which is a suburb of Detroit, Michigan. He is board certified in emergency medicine, internal medicine and critical care medicine. Rivers has published extensively in the field of shock, sepsis and resuscitation.

== Education and career ==
Emanuel Rivers is Vice Chairman and Director of Research for the Department of Emergency Medicine. He is a Senior Staff Attending Physician in the Surgical Critical Care Unit and the Emergency Department at Henry Ford Hospital in Detroit, Michigan.

He received his Bachelor of Science, Master of Public Health, and Doctorate in Medicine from the University of Michigan in Ann Arbor, Michigan. He completed a residency in emergency and internal medicine at Henry Ford Hospital in Detroit, Michigan, followed by a fellowship in critical care medicine at the University of Pittsburgh, Pennsylvania. He is Board certified in Critical Care Medicine, Emergency Medicine and Internal Medicine. He also has a special competency in Hyperbaric Medicine.

Rivers is a national or international research award recipient from the Society of Academic Emergency Medicine (2010), American College of Emergency Physicians (2005), Society of Academic Emergency Medicine (2000), American College of Chest Physicians (2000), Society of Critical Care Medicine and European Society of Critical Care Medicine Research Award (2000). He is a fellow of the American Academy of Emergency Medicine, American College of Chest Physicians and long-standing member of the Society of Critical Care Medicine.

He was the first physician in the history of Henry Ford Hospital to be inducted into the Institute of Medicine, National Academy of Sciences in 2005 and has been called to serve on task forces to advise the United States government on health care issues. He was voted one of the Top Docs in the city of Detroit for the years 2006 to 2010. He is also a quality consultant to 3 of the top ten health care delivery systems in the United States. Rivers' practice and research are based out of the Henry Ford Hospital in Detroit, MI.

Rivers' interests include the evaluation and treatment of critical illness during the early stages of hospital presentation, including in the emergency department and intensive care unit. These conditions include forms of shock associated with sepsis, trauma, hemorrhage, myocardial infarction, pulmonary embolism, and cardiac arrest. He has also studied early detection, treatment, epidemiology, and outcomes in critical illness.

== Contributions ==
The algorithm of emergent resuscitation in the setting of severe sepsis and/or septic shock has been formally conceptualized by Emanuel Rivers in a landmark paper in November 2001 using early goal directed therapy (EGDT) in the emergency department. EGDT has been used and validated for years in the intensive care unit, but Rivers's paper expanded the idea to incorporate all those initially presenting to the ED with signs of severe sepsis or septic shock. Many hospitals across the United States such as Kaiser and Catholic Health Care West have rapidly incorporated the protocol developed by Rivers in their ED treatment algorithms, as well as use it as a quality improvement data point. EGDT has also been cited by the Joint Commission of Hospital Accreditation as a quality improvement initiative for the last two years.

== Discussion ==
Despite some concerns about the validity of the trial (non-blinded, single center, small number of patients, bundled interventions, unusually high mortality in the "control group") EGDT became the de facto standard of care for sepsis for over a decade following publication of the Rivers' trial. The surviving sepsis campaign incorporated EGDT into their protocols for management of sepsis.

In the mid-2010s, three large multi-center RCTs - ProCESS, PROMISE, and ARISE - were performed to confirm the efficacy of EGDT. All three trials demonstrated no improvement in mortality with EGDT compared to usual care. A patient level meta-analysis also found no improvement in mortality with EGDT compared to usual care. The ProCESS trial found that in the sickest sub-group of patients (those with a baseline lactate >5.3 mmol/L) the mortality was significantly higher in the EGDT group as compared to usual care (38.2 vs. 26.4; p = 0.05), suggesting that EGDT should be abandoned.

Despite the lack of benefit seen in these RCTs, the authors of these trials suggest that because Rivers' 2001 study was so well known that it improved the level of "usual care" such that it is similar to EGDT. Evidence-based medicine experts have argued that these three trials reaffirm the principles of early recognition of sepsis, early broad-spectrum antibiotic use and intravenous fluid resuscitation even if the invasive monitoring involved in EGDT is unnecessary.
