= Sepsis Six =

Medical therapies for patients with sepsis

The Sepsis Six is the name given to a bundle of medical therapies designed to reduce mortality in patients with sepsis.

Drawn from international guidelines that emerged from the Surviving Sepsis Campaign the Sepsis Six was developed by The UK Sepsis Trust. (Daniels, Nutbeam, Laver) in 2006 as a practical tool to help healthcare professionals deliver the basics of care rapidly and reliably.

In 2011, The UK Sepsis Trust published evidence that use of the Sepsis Six was associated with a 50% reduction in mortality, a decreased length of stay in hospital, and fewer intensive care days. Though the authors urge caution in a causal interpretation of these findings.

The Sepsis Six consists of three diagnostic and three therapeutic steps – all to be delivered within one hour of the initial diagnosis of sepsis:

1. Titrate oxygen to a saturation target of 94%
2. Take blood cultures and consider source control
3. Administer empiric intravenous antibiotics
4. Measure serial serum lactates
5. Start intravenous fluid resuscitation
6. Commence accurate urine output measurement.
