= Stress hyperglycemia =

Transient elevation of blood glucose caused by stress of illness

Stress hyperglycemia (also called stress diabetes or diabetes of injury) is a medical term referring to transient elevation of the blood glucose due to the stress of illness. It usually resolves spontaneously, but must be distinguished from various forms of diabetes mellitus.

It is often discovered when routine blood chemistry measurements in an ill patient reveal an elevated blood glucose. Blood glucose can be assessed either by a bedside ‘fingerstick’ glucose meter or plasma glucose as performed in a laboratory (the latter being more efficacious). A retrospective cohort study by the Mayo Clinic held that bedside glucometry was a reliable estimate of plasma glucose with a mean difference of 7.9 mg/dL, but still may not coincide with every individual. The glucose is typically in the range of 140–300 mg/dl (7.8-16.7 mM) but occasionally can exceed 500 mg/dl (28 mM), especially if amplified by drugs or intravenous glucose. The blood glucose usually returns to normal within hours unless predisposing drugs and intravenous glucose are continued.

== Cause ==
Stress hyperglycemia is especially common in patients with hypertonic dehydration and those with elevated catecholamine levels (e.g., after emergency department treatment of acute asthma with epinephrine). Steroid diabetes is a specific and prolonged form of stress hyperglycemia.

People who have experienced stress hyperglycemia during severe illness have a threefold risk of developing diabetes in subsequent years, and it may be appropriate to screen for diabetes in survivors of critical illness.

== Diagnosis ==
Diagnosing patient can be complex, as there are no guidelines that specifically define stress hyperglycemia.

== Treatment ==
One of the most sweeping changes in intensive care unit (ICU) and post-surgical care in recent years is the trend toward more aggressive treatment of stress-induced hyperglycemia. The 2008 guidelines from the Surviving Sepsis Campaign recommend insulin therapy in critically ill patients.

A number of research studies have demonstrated that even mildly elevated blood glucose levels (110 mg/dL or 6.1 mmol/L) in a hospital intensive care unit (ICU) can measurably increase the morbidity and mortality of such patients. According to a randomized control trial of over 1500 surgical ICU patients, controlling patients’ blood glucose below 110 mg/dL or 6.1 mmol/L significantly decreased mortality from 8% with conventional treatment to 4.6%, and also decreased morbidity from bloodstream infections by 46%, acute renal failure requiring dialysis or hemofiltration and critical illness polyneuropathy (Van den Berghe, 2001). A subsequent randomized control trial of 1200 medical ICU patients found that intensive insulin therapy significantly reduced morbidity but not mortality among all patients in the medical ICU. On the other hand, several studies failed to show benefit or demonstrated harmful effects (mainly from hypoglycemia) of intensive insulin therapy in critically ill patients. A meta-analysis of studies on this topic could not demonstrate an advantage of tight glycemic control, while there was an increase in hypoglycemia. This questions the validity of current guidelines.

Most recently, the largest randomized control trial to date (with 6104 enrolled patients) comparing the effects of intensive glucose control vs. conventional glucose control in ICU patients found that tight glucose control significantly increased mortality at 90 days after admission to the ICU as compared to conventional glucose control (2.6% increase in the absolute risk of death). In this trial (the NICE-SUGAR Study), patients randomised to the intensive glucose control group had a target blood sugar range of 4.5 to 6.0 mmol/L while those placed in the conventional glucose control group had a blood glucose target range of 8.0 to 10.0 mmol/L (as compared to 10.0 to 11.1 mmol/L in Van den Berghe, 2001). Patients were enrolled from mixed ICU wards (as compared to a surgical ICU in Van den Berghe, 2001). The NICE-SUGAR trial may very well change our approach to the management of stress-induced hyperglycemia in the ICU.
