= Critical illness–related corticosteroid insufficiency =

- Other names: CIRCI

Critical illness–related corticosteroid insufficiency is a form of adrenal insufficiency in critically ill patients who have blood corticosteroid levels which are inadequate for the severe stress response they experience. Combined with decreased glucocorticoid receptor sensitivity and tissue response to corticosteroids, this adrenal insufficiency constitutes a negative prognostic factor for intensive care patients.

The hypothalamic-pituitary-adrenal axis (HPA axis), in which the hypothalamus and pituitary gland control adrenal secretions, undergoes profound changes during critical illness. Both very high and very low levels of cortisol have been linked to a poor outcome in intensive care patients. It has been suggested that high levels could represent severe stress, whereas low levels are due to blunted cortisol production and response.

CIRCI can be suspected in patients with low blood pressure despite resuscitation with intravenous fluids and vasopressor drugs. The Surviving Sepsis Campaign guidelines advocate intravenous hydrocortisone only in adults with septic shock and refractory hypotension. The exact definition of this condition, the best ways to test for corticoid insufficiency in critically ill patients, and the therapeutic use of (usually low doses) of corticosteroids remains a subject of debate.

== Signs and symptoms ==
The best known feature that suggests a possible underlying adrenal insufficiency is low blood pressure despite resuscitation with intravenous fluids, requiring vasopressor drugs. These patients typically display tachycardia and other signs of hyperdynamic shock. Other symptoms include fever, purpura fulminans, and gastrointestinal or neurological disturbances. All these features are relatively non-specific in intensive care patients.

In some patients a specific reason for adrenal insufficiency can be suspected, such as prior intake of corticosteroids that suppressed the HPA axis, or use of enzyme inducing drugs such as phenytoin. Treatment with imidazole drugs such as etomidate, ketoconazole and miconazole can also suppress the HPA axis, as well as drugs used specifically for this purpose, such as metyrapone.

Several blood test abnormalities can suggest corticosteroid insufficiency, such as hypoglycemia, hyponatremia, hyperkalemia, hypercalcemia, neutropenia, eosinophilia, hyperprolactinemia, and hypothyroidism.

== Physiology ==
In acute states of severe stress, cortisol secretion by the adrenal gland increases up to sixfold, parallel to the severity of the condition. This is partly due to an increased secretion of corticotropin-releasing hormone (CRH) and adrenocorticotropic hormone (ACTH). Several cytokines have been also shown to interfere with the HPA axis at multiple levels. There is also an increase in the number and affinity of glucocorticoid receptors. Levels of corticosteroid-binding globulin (CBG) and albumin, which normally bind cortisol, are decreased, resulting in increased levels of free cortisol. Furthermore, anaesthesia drugs like etomidate could interfere with the HPA axis. The secretion also loses its normal diurnal pattern of morning peak levels and evening and night time troughs. Nevertheless, secretion remains pulsatile and there is a marked variation in blood samples from the same individual.

High blood levels of cortisol during critical illness could theoretically be protective because of several reasons. They modulate metabolism (for example, by inducing high blood sugar levels, thereby providing energy to the body). They also suppress excessive immune system activation and exert supporting effects on the circulatory system. Increased susceptibility to infections, hyperglycemia (in patients already prone to stress hyperglycemia), gastrointestinal bleeding, electrolyte disturbances and steroid-induced myopathy (in patients already prone to critical illness polyneuropathy) are possible harmful effects.

Blood levels of dehydroepiandrosterone increase, and levels of dehydroepiandrosterone sulfate decrease in response to critical illness.

In the chronic phase of severe illness, cortisol levels decrease slowly and return to normal when the patient recovers. ACTH levels are however low, and CBG levels increase.

== Diagnosis ==
The exact diagnostic tests and cut-off values to diagnose critical illness-related corticosteroid insufficiency are not agreed upon. This also applies to the distinction between absolute and relative adrenal insufficiency, a reason why the term critical illness–related corticosteroid insufficiency is preferred to relative adrenal insufficiency. The variation in cortisol levels according to disease type and severity, as well as variation within the same patient, hampers the establishment of a clear threshold below which CIRCI occurs. Moreover, in patients whose adrenal glands are already maximally stimulated, a stimulation test would not be informative. Furthermore, a short test might not adequately assess response to the chronic stress of critical illness.

Both random total cortisol levels, total cortisol levels or increment after ACTH stimulation tests, free cortisol levels, or a combination of these have been proposed as diagnostic tests. Other stimulation tests for adrenal insufficiency which are used in non-critical patients, such as the test using metyrapone or a test which employs insulin to induce hypoglycemia, are not preferred for CIRCI. Both a metyrapone-induced decrease in cortisol and hypoglycemia are potentially harmful to intensive care patients. The exact dose of ACTH remains a matter of debate. In the CORTICUS study, ACTH stimulation testing predicted mortality whereas baseline cortisol levels did not. However, possible benefits of corticosteroid therapy do not seem to be completely predicted by ACTH stimulation testing. For these reasons, guidelines currently do not recommend that ACTH stimulation testing should guide the decision whether or not to administer corticosteroids. Cortisol immunoassays on the other hand have been shown to be prone to both over- and underestimation.

== Treatment ==
In adults with septic shock and refractory hypotension despite resuscitation with intravenous fluids and vasopressors, hydrocortisone is the preferred corticosteroid. It can be divided in several doses or administered as a continuous infusion. Fludrocortisone is optional in CIRCI, and dexamethasone is not recommended. Little evidence is available to judge when and how corticosteroid therapy should be stopped; guidelines recommend tapering corticosteroids when vasopressors are no longer needed.

Corticosteroid treatment has also been suggested as an early treatment option in patient with acute respiratory distress syndrome. Steroids have not been shown beneficial for sepsis alone. Historically, higher doses of steroids were given, but these have been suggested to be harmful compared to the lower doses which are advocated today.

In the CORTICUS study, hydrocortisone hastened the reversal of septic shock, but did not influence mortality, with an increased occurrence of septic shock relapse and hypernatremia. The latter findings tempered enthusiasm for the broad use of hydrocortisone in septic shock. Prior to this study, several other smaller studies showed beneficial effects of long courses of low doses of corticoid. Several factors (such as lack of statistical power due to slow recruitment) could have led a false-negative finding on mortality in the CORTICUS study; thus, more research is needed.

== See also ==
- Adrenal insufficiency
- Addison's disease
- Cortisol
- Hypothalamic–pituitary–adrenal axis
- Glucocorticoids
