= Sepsis Alliance =

U.S. non-profit organization

- Abbreviation: SA
- Established: 2004
- Type: Non-profit
- Headquarters: San Diego, California, U.S.
- Founder: Carl Flatley, DDS, MSD
- Affiliations: Global Sepsis Alliance
- Website: www.sepsis.org
- Remarks: Names: -American Sepsis Alliance (2004–2007) -Sepsis Alliance (since 2007)

Sepsis Alliance is a non-profit organization dedicated to raising awareness of sepsis. This awareness is accomplished through a variety of methods, including healthcare professional education programs, outreach to the general population, and lobbying for regulatory measures which improve outcomes for individuals with sepsis. The organization is recognized as a 501(c)(3) charity by the Internal Revenue Service.

== History ==
In 2002, Erin K. Flatley, a 23-year-old woman studying to be an elementary school teacher, underwent a minor outpatient surgical procedure. Within days, she was experiencing incredible pain that prompted her family to bring her to the emergency department. On April 30, 2002, six days after her procedure, Erin died from septic shock. Tests performed at the hospital revealed significantly elevated white blood counts; however, neither Erin nor her parents were aware of these blood test results until after her death.

Erin's father, Carl Flatley, a retired endodontist from Dunedin, Florida, researched the causes of sepsis in the months that followed his daughter's death, later noting with frustration that he had lost his daughter to "something he had never even heard of." In 2003, he founded the Sepsis Alliance in order to change clinical practice in the United States by educating doctors and emergency room workers about sepsis.

"You don't want to panic people. We all get infections and, thank God, most of them heal," he says. "So this is what I tell people: If you're feeling bad all over and have a high temperature and either high or low blood pressure, those are all indications that your whole system has been infected. It could be sepsis."

== Funding ==
Sepsis Alliance is a patient advocacy non-profit organization funded by contributions from individual donors, corporations, and foundations. In addition to these major sources of funding, Sepsis Alliance is a named beneficiary from several annual fundraisers, and also generates income from sepsis-related materials.

== Sepsis awareness ==
In 2010, Sepsis Alliance commissioned its first public survey, designed to gauge public perception of sepsis. Prepared by Harris Interactive, the survey asked 1,004 adults whether they were familiar with sepsis. According to the survey, 66% of respondents had never even heard of sepsis. Among those who had heard of sepsis, 35% did not know what sepsis was, while 55% thought that sepsis was a type of infection. Thomas Heymann, President of Sepsis Alliance, noted, "The fact that only one-third of respondents had even heard of sepsis, let alone understood what it was, reinforces the urgent need for increased public awareness of sepsis."

Awareness is increasing slowly, as seen in annual surveys. The 2013 survey, also prepared by Harris Interactive, found that only 44% of adult Americans had heard of sepsis. Among over 2,500 U.S. adults, younger Americans were significantly less likely to have heard the term "sepsis," with 57% of U.S. adults ages 18–34 indicating that they had never heard of it, (compared to 47% of those age 35–44, 39% of those age 45–54 and 36 percent of older Americans aged 55+). In addition, women were much more likely to have of sepsis, with 49% of women saying they have, compared to 38% of men confirming they had heard the term. The 2015 survey revealed similar findings. The survey found that American adults were more familiar with rarer illnesses than sepsis. For example, 86% reported knowing about Ebola, 74% knowing about ALS, and 76% knowing about malaria, while only 47% of Americans were as aware about sepsis. Results of the 2016 survey noted that about half of Americans had heard of sepsis.

In 2018, sepsis awareness rose to 65%. The 2018 survey, conducted by Radius Global Market Research, revealed that awareness of sepsis rose to a new high with 65% of adults in the U.S. reporting they have heard the term sepsis. However, while the word sepsis is more well known, the survey also demonstrated that awareness of sepsis symptoms is still low; 36% of respondents said they did not know the symptoms and only 12% could correctly identify four common sepsis symptoms.

In 2017, Sepsis Alliance commissioned a survey to assess parent knowledge of sepsis in relation to their children. The survey, also conducted by Radius Global Market Research, found that while 77% of parents surveyed were familiar with the word sepsis, only 28% could identify the common signs of pediatric sepsis. While as many as 92% of pediatric sepsis cases begin in the community, 41% of parents believed that their children could only develop sepsis while hospitalized.

On July 26, 2011, Rachael Ray featured a segment called "What Is Sepsis". The segment featured Dr. Flatley and Dr. James O'Brien, an intensive care unit (ICU) doctor and Director at Sepsis Alliance. In a pre-taped segment, Dr. O'Brien introduced viewers to Jennifer Ludwin, a survivor of H1N1 influenza. Ludwin's legs and most of her fingers were amputated due to complications from sepsis. Ludwin, a graduate student at the time at Ohio State University, went on to become a speaker on H1N1 and sepsis, even appearing in her own TEDxTalk in April, 2012.

In 2016, Sepsis Alliance partnered with The Michigan Health & Hospital Association's Keystone Center to raise awareness about sepsis across the state through a series of events.

In 2023, The New York Times reported on a new survey of over 5,000 hospitals found that about 73 percent had sepsis teams, but only 55 percent had a leader with time allocated to manage the program. Only about half of hospitals integrate their sepsis programs with antibiotic stewardship initiatives, despite the fact that these drugs are the key to recovery.

== Sepsis Awareness Month ==
In 2011, Sepsis Alliance launched Sepsis Awareness Month. Sepsis Awareness Month is promoted every September through social media, and online and traditional media. Supporters are encouraged to participate in awareness activities, such as photo challenges, slogan contests, wearing red and black ribbons, and distributing sepsis awareness materials. The Know Sepsis tagline is also promoted among healthcare professionals, and facilities are encouraged to promote sepsis awareness through workshops, lectures, and special events.

== It's About TIME campaign ==
In the spring of 2018, Sepsis Alliance launched a broad-based national campaign to raise awareness of sepsis as a medical emergency. The campaign centered around the acronym T-I-M-E which stands for:

- Temperature: higher or lower than normal
- Infection: patient may have signs and symptoms of an infection
- Mental decline: patient may be confused, sleepy, difficult to rouse
- Extremely ill: patient may express feelings of severe pain or discomfort, with statements like "I feel like I might die."

Angelica Hale, a finalist in the reality television program America's Got Talent, was recruited as the spokesperson for the campaign. Hale was diagnosed with sepsis at the age of four.

== World Sepsis Day and Global Sepsis Alliance ==
Sepsis Alliance was one of the original founding members of the Global Sepsis Alliance (GSA), which supports the efforts of caregivers as they seek to better understand and combat sepsis. Sepsis Alliance and other members of the GSA hosted the Merinoff Symposium on September 29, 2010, bringing together global experts on sepsis to help create a public definition of sepsis, a molecular definition of sepsis, and a global call to action to recognize sepsis as a medical emergency.

GSA and its member organizations launched the first global World Sepsis Day on September 13, 2012, and it continues to be celebrated on that day annually around the world. Hospitals and healthcare organizations, such as Cookeville Regional Medical Center in Tennessee and Via Christi Pittsburg medical center in Kansas, have used this day to showcase their efforts in sepsis detection and prevention.

In the U.S., Sepsis Alliance marked the occasion by hosting its first-ever Sepsis Heroes event, designed to recognize sepsis survivors, doctors, and healthcare providers that have helped raised awareness of sepsis in the community. Held in New York City, Sepsis Heroes was one of the first Sepsis Alliance-produced events to bring both survivors and healthcare professionals in one location. Earlier recipients of the Sepsis Heroes awards included Jen Ludwin, the North Shore-LIJ Health System, and the founders of two local fundraisers dedicated to raising funds and awareness of sepsis.

Previous Sepsis Heroes events have honored Gary Black, New York State Governor Andrew M. Cuomo, GE Healthcare Education Services, David Goldhill, Mark Lambert, and the Surviving Sepsis Campaign.
