= Spontaneous breathing trial =

A spontaneous breathing trial (SBT) is a test for patients on mechanical ventilation, before they can be extubated and liberated from mechanical ventilation, i.e. return to normal breathing. SBTs are daily tests performed on intubated patients to determine if they meet criteria for extubation.

The SBT involves placing the patient on minimal ventilatory support for a set period, typically 30–120 minutes, and under close monitoring. There are two common methods: In a T-Piece Trial, the ventilator is completely removed, and the patient breathes through a T-piece connected to the endotracheal tube and supplied with humidified oxygen. Because no ventilatory support is provided, this provides a pure test of the patient’s ability to breathe independently, and is more challenging. More commonly, low-level pressure support ventilation can be used, providing some inspiratory pressure (typically 5-8 cmH₂O) with or without Positive End-Expiratory Pressure (PEEP) (usually ≤5 cmH₂O). Automatic tube compensation (ATC) or minimal PSV helps patients overcome the added resistance of the endotracheal tube. This method is easier than a T-piece trial and is commonly used in ICU settings. Patients are more likely to be successfully extubated after a PSV trial compared to a T-piece trial.

Spontaneous breathing trials (SBT) are often combined with spontaneous awakening trials (SAT).

== Indications for trials of spontaneous breathing ==
- Fraction of inspired oxygen (F_{I}O_{2}) less than 50%
- Positive end expiratory pressure (PEEP) less than 8 cm water
- "Minimal vent settings"
  - e.g., ratio of arterial partial pressure of oxygen to F_{I}O_{2} (P/F ratio) in the vicinity of 400

== Assessment Criteria ==
A spontaneous breathing trial includes assessment of several criteria, including respiratory parameters, oxygenation, hemodynamics, mental status, and presence of airway/cough reflexes:

Respiratory Parameters

- Respiratory Rate (RR): < 35 breaths/min
- Tidal Volume ($V_T$): > 5 mL/kg ideal body weight
- Rapid Shallow Breathing Index (RSBI): < 105 breaths/min/L
- No excessive accessory muscle use or paradoxical breathing

Oxygenation Criteria

- SpO₂: ≥ 90% on FiO₂ ≤ 40-50% and PEEP ≤ 5 cmH₂O
- PaO₂/FiO₂ ratio: ≥ 150-200 mmHg

Hemodynamic Stability

- Heart Rate (HR): Stable, with no increase >20% from baseline
- Blood Pressure (BP): No severe hypotension or hypertension
- No new arrhythmias or ECG changes

Neurological and Secretions Criteria

- Awake and cooperative (able to protect airway)
- Effective cough and secretion clearance

The SBT is stopped early if the patient shows signs of intolerance, including:

- RR > 35 breaths/min for >5 minutes
- SpO₂ < 88% (or >5% drop from baseline)
- HR > 140 bpm or increase >20% from baseline
- SBP >180 or <90 mmHg
- Severe diaphoresis, agitation, or anxiety
- Use of accessory muscles, paradoxical breathing
- Respiratory acidosis (pH < 7.30 with rising PaCO₂)

If a patient fails the SBT, they are placed back on ventilatory support, and the cause of failure is assessed (e.g., muscle weakness, excess secretions, cardiac dysfunction, etc.). SBTs are typically repeated daily. More performing SBTs more frequently than daily is not associated with increased likelihood of successful extubation.
