= Early goal-directed therapy =

Critical care practices for sepsis

Early goal-directed therapy (EGDT or EGDT) was introduced by Emanuel P. Rivers in The New England Journal of Medicine in 2001 and is a technique used in critical care medicine involving intensive monitoring and aggressive management of perioperative hemodynamics in patients with a high risk of morbidity and mortality. In cardiac surgery, goal-directed therapy has proved effective when commenced after surgery. The combination of GDT and Point-of-Care Testing has demonstrated a marked decrease in mortality for patients undergoing congenital heart surgery. Furthermore, a reduction in morbidity and mortality has been associated with GDT techniques when used in conjunction with an electronic medical record.

Early goal-directed therapy is a more specific form of therapy used for the treatment of severe sepsis and septic shock. This approach involves adjustments of cardiac preload, afterload, and contractility to balance oxygen delivery with an increased oxygen demand before surgery.

Three trials published in 2014/2015 have shown that early goal directed therapy should be abandoned.

== Evidence ==
EGDT, as compared to usual modern care, does not appear to improve outcomes but results in greater expense.

== Elements ==
In the event of hypotension and/or lactate greater than 4 mmol/L, initial management includes a minimum fluid challenge of 30 ml/kg of crystalloid solution. Crystalloid solutions are recommended over colloid solutions given the cost and lack in difference of mortality benefit. Albumin may be considered if large amounts of crystalloid solution is needed.

Indications of a positive response to fluid resuscitation may include:

- a transient increase in central venous pressure (CVP)
- a decrease in heart rate

If hypotension persists despite fluid resuscitation (septic shock) and/or lactate > 4 mmol/L (36 mg/dl), goals in the first 6 hours of resuscitation include:

- Achieve CVP of 8-12 mmHg. Mechanical ventilation, increased abdominal pressure, and preexisting impaired ventricular compliance may require higher CVP targets of 12-15 mmHg
- Achieve superior vena cava oxygen saturation (ScvO2) of > 70% OR mixed venous oxygen saturation (SvO2) of > 65%. If initial fluid resuscitation fails to achieve adequate oxygen saturation, additional options include dobutamine infusion (maximum 20 μg/kg/min) or transfusion of packed red blood cells to a hematocrit ≥ 30%. If a ScvO2 is unavailable, lactate normalization may be used as a surrogate marker. A reduction in lactate by ≥ 10% is noninferior to achieving a ScvO2 of ≥ 70%
- Achieve mean arterial pressure (MAP) ≥ 65mmHg The presence of atherosclerosis or pre-existing uncontrolled hypertension may necessitate a higher MAP target.
- Achieve urine output ≥ 0.5 mL/kg/h
