= SOFA score =

Medical assessment of organ failure

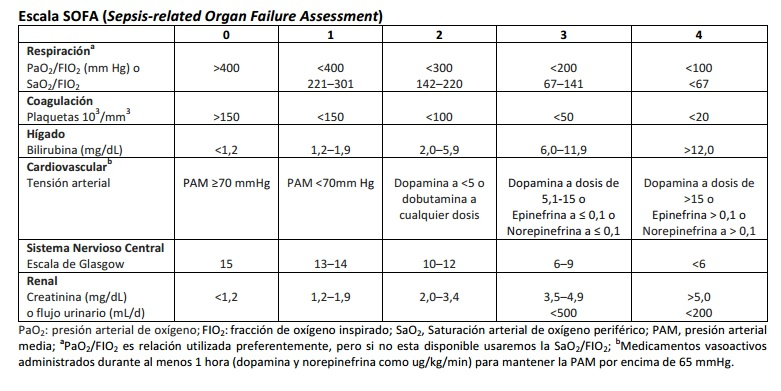
- A patient's SOFA score assessment
- Purpose: determine rate of organ failure

The sequential organ failure assessment score (SOFA score), previously known as the sepsis-related organ failure assessment score, is used to track a person's status during the stay in an intensive care unit (ICU) to determine the extent of a person's organ function or rate of failure. The score is based on six different scores, one each for the respiratory, cardiovascular, hepatic, coagulation, renal and neurological systems.

The score tables below only describe points-giving conditions. In cases where the physiological parameters do not match any row, zero points are given. In cases where the physiological parameters match more than one row, the row with most points is picked.

The quick SOFA score (qSOFA) assists health care providers in estimating the risk of morbidity and mortality due to sepsis.

== Medical use ==
The SOFA scoring system is useful in predicting the clinical outcomes of critically ill patients. According to an observational study at an Intensive Care Unit (ICU) in Belgium, the mortality rate is at least 50% when the score is increased, regardless of initial score, in the first 96 hours of admission, 27% to 35% if the score remains unchanged, and less than 27% if the score is reduced. Score ranges from 0 (best) to 24 (worst) points.

	Central nervous system	Cardiovascular system	Respiratory system	Coagulation	Liver	Renal function
Score	Glasgow coma scale	Mean arterial pressure OR administration of vasopressors required	PaO_{2}/FiO_{2} [mmHg (kPa)]	Platelets (×10^{3}/μl)	Bilirubin (mg/dl) [μmol/L]	Creatinine (mg/dl) [μmol/L] (or urine output)
+0	15	MAP ≥ 70 mmHg	≥ 400 (53.3)	≥ 150	< 1.2 [< 20]	< 1.2 [< 110]
+1	13–14	MAP < 70 mmHg	< 400 (53.3)	< 150	1.2–1.9 [20-32]	1.2–1.9 [110-170]
+2	10–12	dopamine ≤ 5 μg/kg/min or dobutamine (any dose)	< 300 (40)	< 100	2.0–5.9 [33-101]	2.0–3.4 [171-299]
+3	6–9	dopamine > 5 μg/kg/min OR epinephrine ≤ 0.1 μg/kg/min OR norepinephrine ≤ 0.1 μg/kg/min	< 200 (26.7) and mechanically ventilated including CPAP	< 50	6.0–11.9 [102-204]	3.5–4.9 [300-440] (or < 500 ml/day)
+4	< 6	dopamine > 15 μg/kg/min OR epinephrine > 0.1 μg/kg/min OR norepinephrine > 0.1 μg/kg/min	< 100 (13.3) and mechanically ventilated including CPAP	< 20	> 12.0 [> 204]	> 5.0 [> 440] (or < 200 ml/day)

== Quick SOFA score ==
The Quick SOFA Score (quickSOFA or qSOFA) was introduced by the Sepsis-3 group in February 2016 as a simplified version of the SOFA Score as an initial way to identify patients at high risk for poor outcome with an infection. The SIRS Criteria definitions of sepsis are being replaced as they were found to possess too many limitations; the "current use of 2 or more SIRS criteria to identify sepsis was unanimously considered by the task force to be unhelpful." The qSOFA simplifies the SOFA score drastically by only including its 3 clinical criteria and by including "any altered mentation" instead of requiring a GCS <15. qSOFA can easily and quickly be repeated serially on patients.

Assessment	qSOFA score
Low blood pressure (SBP ≤ 100 mmHg)	1
High respiratory rate (≥ 22 breaths/min)	1
Altered mentation (GCS ≤ 14)	1

The score ranges from 0 to 3 points. The presence of 2 or more qSOFA points near the onset of infection was associated with a greater risk of death or prolonged intensive care unit stay. These are outcomes that are more common in infected patients who may be septic than those with uncomplicated infection. Based upon these findings, the Third International Consensus Definitions for Sepsis recommends qSOFA as a simple prompt to identify infected patients outside the ICU who are likely to be septic.

qSOFA has also been found to be poorly sensitive though decently specific for the risk of death with SIRS possibly better for screening.

=== qSOFA utility ===
The qSOFA was designed to be used in non-ICU settings, where the healthcare provider might not have access to all the information used in the SOFA score. Settings include the emergency department or other healthcare settings where patients are initially assessed. The three criteria used (systolic blood pressure, respiratory rate, and GCS) can be quickly gathered in the emergency department, to risk stratify patients and provide potentially ill patients with quick interventions. This scoring system is used to identify potential patients with sepsis.

In 2019, the surviving sepsis campaign detailed a bundle of medical interventions to be done within the first hour of presentation on septic patients to reduce mortality, so quick identification of these patients with the qSOFA score is important to treat quickly. This group of interventions is the one hour bundle and includes:

- Measure lactate level
- Draw blood culture before starting antibiotics
- Start broad spectrum antibiotics
- Rapidly give crystalloids if hypotensive or lactate greater than or equal to 4 mmol/L
- Give vasopressors if still hypotensive after crystalloid administration

One study found the one hour bundle to have no significant improvement in in-hospital mortality over patients given the 3 or 6 hour bundles that have been previously recommended by the surviving sepsis campaign.

== See also ==
- APACHE II
