= Solid fats and added sugars =

Solid fats and added sugars (SoFAS) is a dietary education program of the USDA regarding overconsumption of saturated fats, transfats (which are both solid at room temperature) and artificially added sugars especially in highly processed foods.
