= Organ dysfunction =

Condition where an organ does not perform its expected function

Organ dysfunction is a condition where an organ does not perform its expected function. Organ failure is organ dysfunction to such a degree that normal homeostasis cannot be maintained without external clinical intervention or life support. It is not a diagnosis. It can be classified by the cause, but when the cause is not known, it can also be classified by whether the onset is chronic or acute.

Multiple organ failure can be associated with sepsis and is often fatal. Countries such as Spain have shown a rise in mortality risk due to a large elderly population there. There are tools physicians use when diagnosing multiple organ failure and when prognosing the outcome. The Sequential Organ Failure Assessment (SOFA) score uses early lab values in a patient's hospitalization (within 24 hours) to predict fatal outcomes for a patient.
