= Horowitz index =

Ratio used to assess lung function

- LOINC: 50982-8, 50984-4, 50983-6, 50985-1, 50986-9

The Horowitz index or Horovitz index (also known as the Horowitz quotient or the P/F ratio) is a ratio used to assess lung function in patients, particularly those on ventilators. Overall, it is useful for evaluating the extent of damage to the lungs. The simple abbreviation as oxygenation can lead to confusion with other conceptualizations of oxygenation index.

The Horowitz index is defined as the ratio of partial pressure of oxygen in blood (PaO2), in millimeters of mercury, and the fraction of oxygen in the inhaled air (FiO2) — the PaO_{2}/FiO_{2} ratio. This is calculated by dividing the PaO2 by the FiO2.

Example: patient who is receiving an FiO2 of .5 (i.e., 50%) with a measured PaO2 of 60 mmHg has a PaO_{2}/FiO_{2} ratio of 120.

In healthy lungs, the Horowitz index depends on age and usually falls between 350 and 450. A value below 300 is the threshold for mild lung injury, and 200 is indicative of a moderately severe lung injury. A value below 100 is a criterion for a severe injury.

== History ==
The Horowitz index was first proposed in a 1974 paper by Joel H. Horovitz and two co-authors, Charles Carrico and G. Tom Shires. The reason for the spelling with w is unclear.

In this study, the authors utilized the PaO_{2}/FiO_{2} ratio to compare patients treated with varying inspired oxygen concentrations. One of the major reasons for the use of this ratio is that it is simple to calculate in critically ill patients. These patients often have arterial blood gas samples taken, which allows providers to measure the PaO2.

== Uses ==
The Horowitz ratio has used in scoring systems to grade severity in diseases such as acute respiratory distress syndrome (ARDS), sepsis, and community-acquired pneumonia.

=== ARDS ===
The Horowitz index plays a major role in the diagnosis of ARDS. Three severities of ARDS are categorized based on the degree of hypoxemia using the Horowitz index, according to the Berlin definition. The Horowitz index also correlates to mortality in ARDS.

ARDS Severity	PaO2/FiO2	Mortality
Mild	200-300	27%
Moderate	100-200	32%
Severe	<100	45%

*Table adapted from Ranieri et al.

=== Sepsis ===
The Horowitz index is used in multiple severity scoring systems in sepsis. These include the SOFA, APACHE IV, SAPS-II and SAPS-III scoring systems.

=== Community-Acquired Pneumonia ===
In patients with community-acquired pneumonia, the Horowitz index is used in the SMART-COP score. This score predicts the need for additional respiratory support in community-acquired pneumonia. This score can help medical providers determine a patient's need for admission to an intensive care unit (ICU) or further intensive respiratory support or vasopressor medications. Further support or admission to the ICU should be considered in patients <50 years old with a Horowitz index <333 mmHg or >50 years old with Horowitz index <250 mmHg.

== See also ==
- Arterial blood gas
