= Surviving Sepsis Campaign =

Healthcare initiative

The Surviving Sepsis Campaign (SSC) is a global initiative to bring together professional organizations in reducing mortality from sepsis. The purpose of the SSC is to create an international collaborative effort to improve the treatment of sepsis and reduce the high mortality rate associated with the condition. The Surviving Sepsis Campaign and the Institute for Healthcare Improvement have teamed up to achieve a 25 percent reduction in sepsis mortality by 2009. The guidelines were updated in 2016 and again in 2021.

== Relevance ==
Mortality associated with severe sepsis remains high at 30-50%. When shock is present, mortality is reported to be even higher at around 50-60%. Approximately 1400 people die from sepsis each day throughout the world.

In the U.S. there are approximately 750,000 new sepsis cases each year, with at least 210,000 fatalities and this is reported to be same throughout Europe. As medicine becomes more advanced, with invasive procedures and immunosuppression, the incidence of sepsis is likely to increase even more.

Sepsis is one of the complications of Coronavirus disease 2019. In 2020, the campaign produced Guidelines on the Management of Critically Ill Adults with Coronavirus Disease 2019.

== Approach ==
This is done using a six-pronged approach:

- Building awareness of sepsis
- Improving diagnosis
- Increasing the use of appropriate treatment
- Educating healthcare professionals
- Improving post-intensive care unit (ICU) care
- Developing guidelines of care
- Facilitating data collection for the purposes of audit and feedback (SSC Guidelines 2008)

== Using bundles in health care ==
Using bundles in health care simplifies the complex processes of the care of patients with severe sepsis. A bundle is a selected set of elements of care distilled from evidence-based practice guidelines that, when implemented as a group, have an effect on outcomes beyond implementing the individual elements alone. Each hospital's sepsis protocol may be customized, but it must meet the standards created by the bundle.

The first 6-hour SSC Resuscitation Bundle includes:

- Blood cultures obtained prior to antibiotic administration.
- serum lactate measured
- Broad-spectrum antibiotics administered within two hours of admission/diagnosis. For every hour a patient is denied AB therapy after the onset of septic shock, the patient's chance of survival is reduced by 7.9% (Survivesepsis.org 2005). The 2012 guidelines differ: Administration of broad-spectrum antimicrobials therapy within 1 hr of recognition of septic shock (1B) and severe sepsis without septic shock.

Further management is centered on Early Goal Directed Therapy (EGDT).

- In the event of hypotension and/or lactate > 4 mmol/L, delivering an initial minimum of 20 ml/kg of crystalloid or 5mls/kg of colloid. Recent updates to Surviving Sepsis Campaign recommend 30ml/kg bolus.
- Apply vasopressors, usually noradrenaline for hypotension not responding to initial fluid resuscitation to maintain mean arterial pressure (MAP) > 65 mm Hg, in the event of persistent hypotension despite fluid resuscitation (septic shock) and/or lactate > 4 mmol/L (36 mg/dl):

Resuscitation Goals are:

- To achieve central venous pressure (CVP) of > 8 mm Hg
- To achieve central venous oxygen saturation (ScvO2) of > 70%
- To achieve MAP > 65 mmHg and a urine output of > 0.5 ml/kg/h

The 24-hour SSC Management Bundle includes:

- Low-dose steroids administered for septic shock in accordance with a standardized ICU policy
- Glucose control maintained below upper limit of normal (8.3 mmol/L) with an insulin sliding scale regime (usually short-acting insulin such as Human Actrapid)
- Lung Protective Ventilator Strategy utilising 5-8 mls/kg tidal volumes for mechanically ventilated patients to avoid volutrauma and barotrauma.
