= Acute respiratory distress syndrome =

Respiratory failure due to widespread inflammation in the lungs

- Other names: Respiratory distress syndrome (RDS), adult respiratory distress syndrome, shock lung, wet lung
- Chest x-ray
- Specialty: Critical care medicine
- Symptoms: Shortness of breath, rapid breathing, bluish skin coloration, chest pain, loss of speech
- Complications: Blood clots, Collapsed lung (pneumothorax), Infections, Scarring (pulmonary fibrosis)
- Usual onset: Within a week
- Diagnostic method: Adults: PaO_{2}/FiO_{2} ratio of less than 300 mm Hg; Children: oxygenation index > 4
- Differential diagnosis: Heart failure
- Treatment: Mechanical ventilation, ECMO
- Prognosis: 35–46% risk of death
- Frequency: 3 million per year

Acute respiratory distress syndrome (ARDS) is a type of respiratory failure characterized by rapid onset of widespread inflammation in the lungs. Symptoms include shortness of breath (dyspnea), rapid breathing (tachypnea), and bluish skin coloration (cyanosis). For those who survive, a decreased quality of life is common.

Causes may include sepsis, pancreatitis, trauma, pneumonia, and aspiration. The underlying mechanism involves diffuse injury to cells which form the barrier of the microscopic air sacs of the lungs, surfactant dysfunction, activation of the immune system, and dysfunction of the body's regulation of blood clotting. In effect, ARDS impairs the lungs' ability to exchange oxygen and carbon dioxide. Adult diagnosis is based on a PaO_{2}/FiO_{2} ratio (ratio of partial pressure arterial oxygen and fraction of inspired oxygen) of less than 300 mm Hg despite a positive end-expiratory pressure (PEEP) of more than 5 cm H_{2}O. Cardiogenic pulmonary edema, as the cause, must be excluded.

Environmental exposures have been associated with an increased susceptibility to acute respiratory distress syndrome (ARDS). Chronic exposure to ambient air pollution, such as fine particulate matter (PM2.5) and ozone, have been linked to higher risks of developing ARDS following acute events such as sepsis or trauma. The exposures are thought to contribute to baseline pulmonary inflammation and endothelial dysfunction, potentially amplifying the response to subsequent lung injury. Some studies have also reported associations between higher ambient ozone levels and increased mortality among patients with ARDS.

The primary treatment involves mechanical ventilation together with treatments directed at the underlying cause. Ventilation strategies include using low volumes and low pressures. If oxygenation remains insufficient, lung recruitment maneuvers and neuromuscular blockers may be used. If these are insufficient, extracorporeal membrane oxygenation (ECMO) may be an option. The syndrome is associated with a death rate between 35 and 46%.

Globally, ARDS affects more than 3 million people a year. The condition was first described in 1967. Although the terminology of "adult respiratory distress syndrome" has at times been used to differentiate ARDS from "infant respiratory distress syndrome" in newborns, the international consensus is that "acute respiratory distress syndrome" is the best term because ARDS can affect people of all ages. There are separate diagnostic criteria for children and those in areas of the world with fewer resources.

Environmental and geographic factors may also contribute to variation in ARDS incidence and outcomes, as populations with higher exposure to air pollution have demonstrated increased susceptibility and worse clinical outcomes. ARDS accounts for approximately 10% of intensive care unit (ICU) admissions and up to 23% of patients requiring mechanical ventilation, with mortality rates ranging from 30% to 45% depending on severity and comorbid conditions.

== Signs and symptoms ==
The signs and symptoms of ARDS often begin within two hours of an inciting event, but have been known to take as long as 1–3 days; diagnostic criteria require a known insult to have happened within 7 days of the syndrome. Signs and symptoms may include shortness of breath, fast breathing, and a low oxygen level in the blood due to abnormal ventilation. Other common symptoms include muscle fatigue and general weakness, low blood pressure, a dry, hacking cough, and fever.

=== Complications ===
Complications may include the following:

- Lungs: barotrauma (volutrauma), pulmonary embolism (PE), pulmonary fibrosis, ventilator-associated pneumonia (VAP)
- Gastrointestinal: bleeding (ulcer), dysmotility, pneumoperitoneum, bacterial translocation
- Neurological: hypoxic brain damage
- Cardiac: abnormal heart rhythms, myocardial dysfunction
- Kidney: acute kidney failure, positive fluid balance
- Mechanical: vascular injury, pneumothorax (by placing pulmonary artery catheter), tracheal injury/stenosis (result of intubation and/or irritation by endotracheal tube)
- Nutritional: malnutrition (catabolic state), electrolyte abnormalities

Other complications that are typically associated with ARDS include:

- Atelectasis: small air pockets within the lung collapse
- Complications that arise from treatment in a hospital: blood clots formed by lying down for long periods of time, weakness in muscles that are used for breathing, stress ulcers, and issues with mental health and depression.
- Failure of multiple organs
- Pulmonary hypertension or increase in blood pressure in the main artery from the heart to the lungs. This complication typically occurs due to the restriction of the blood vessel due to inflammation of the mechanical ventilation

== Causes ==
There are direct and indirect causes of ARDS depending whether the lungs are initially affected. Direct causes include pneumonia (including bacterial and viral), aspiration, inhalational lung injury, lung contusion, chest trauma, and near-drowning. Indirect causes include sepsis, shock, pancreatitis, trauma (e.g. fat embolism), cardiopulmonary bypass, TRALI, burns, increased intracranial pressure. Fewer cases of ARDS are linked to large volumes of fluid used during post-trauma resuscitation.

== Pathophysiology ==
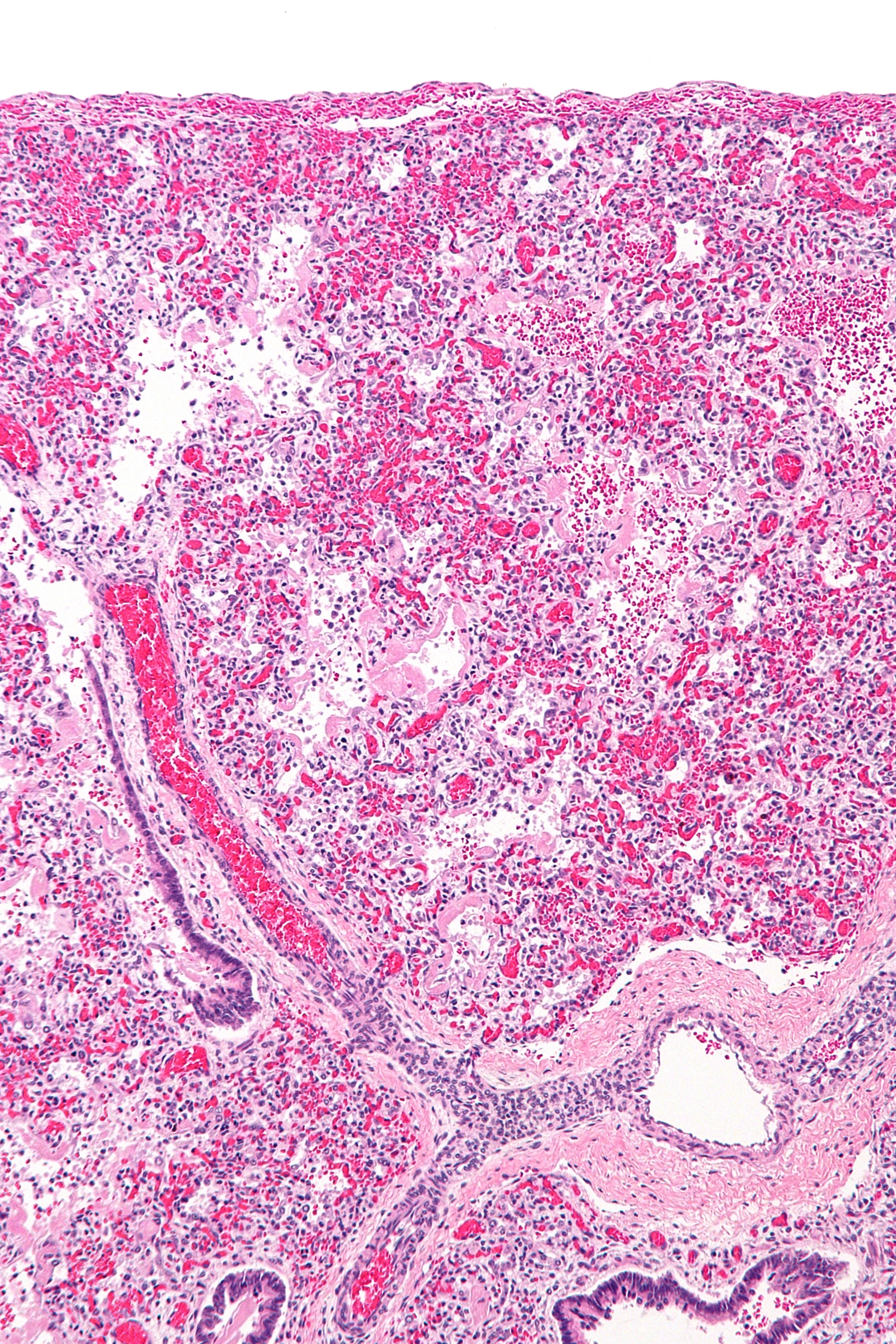
Micrograph of diffuse alveolar damage, the histologic correlate of ARDS. H&E stain.

ARDS is a form of fluid accumulation in the lungs not explained by heart failure (noncardiogenic pulmonary edema). It is typically provoked by an acute injury to the lungs that results in flooding of the lungs' microscopic air sacs responsible for the exchange of gases such as oxygen and carbon dioxide with capillaries in the lungs. Additional common findings in ARDS include partial collapse of the alveoli (atelectasis) and low levels of oxygen in the blood (hypoxemia). The clinical syndrome is associated with pathological findings including pneumonia, eosinophilic pneumonia, cryptogenic organizing pneumonia, acute fibrinous organizing pneumonia, and diffuse alveolar damage (DAD). Of these, the pathology most commonly associated with ARDS is DAD, which is characterized by a diffuse inflammation of lung tissue. The triggering insult to the tissue usually results in an initial release of chemical signals and other inflammatory mediators secreted by local epithelial and endothelial cells.

Neutrophils and some T-lymphocytes quickly migrate into the inflamed lung tissue and contribute in the amplification of the phenomenon. The typical histological presentation involves diffuse alveolar damage and hyaline membrane formation in alveolar walls. Although the triggering mechanisms are not completely understood, recent research has examined the role of inflammation and mechanical stress.

One research group has reported that broncho-alveolar lavage fluid in later-stage ARDS often contains trichomonads, in an amoeboid form (i.e. lacking their characteristic flagellum) which makes them difficult to identify under the microscope.

There is growing awareness that ARDS is not a single disease, but consists of sub-phenotypes which likely have distinct underlying mechanisms. However sub-phenotyping using the blood may not reflect changes in the alveolar space, with implications for future stratified medicine trials.

== Diagnosis ==
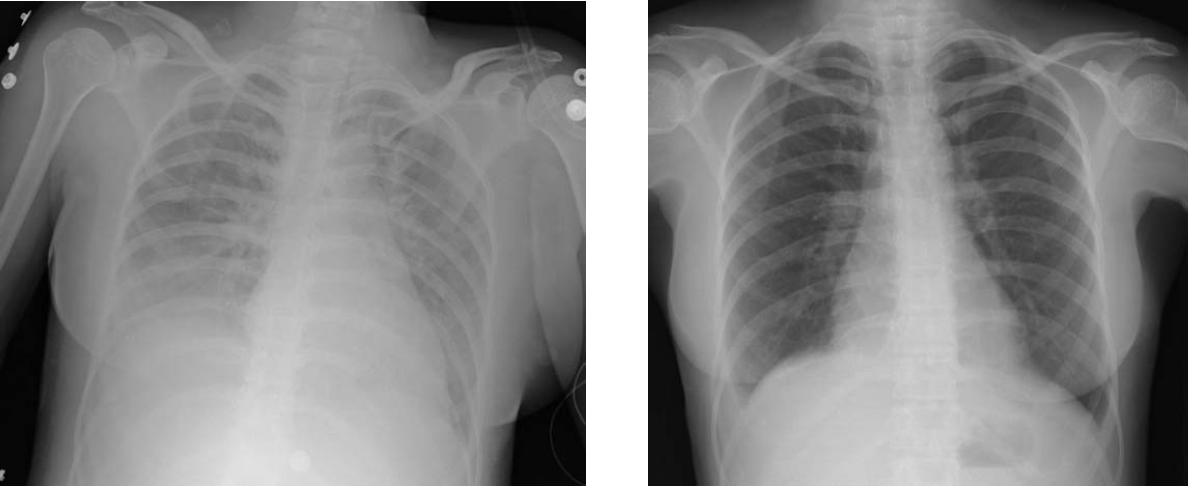
A chest x-ray of transfusion-related acute lung injury (left) which led to ARDS. Right is the same patient with resolved injury 72 hours after ventilator support. Note the clearance of bilateral diffuse infiltrates.

=== Diagnostic criteria ===
Diagnostic criteria for ARDS have changed over time as understanding of the pathophysiology has evolved. The international consensus criteria for ARDS were most recently updated in 2012 and are known as the "Berlin definition". In addition to generally broadening the diagnostic thresholds, other notable changes from the prior 1994 consensus criteria include discouraging the term "acute lung injury", and defining grades of ARDS severity according to degree of decrease in the oxygen content of the blood.

According to the 2012 Berlin definition, adult ARDS is characterized by the following:

- lung injury of acute onset, within 1 week of an apparent clinical insult and with the progression of respiratory symptoms
- bilateral opacities on chest imaging (chest radiograph or CT) not explained by other lung pathology (e.g. effusion, lobar/lung collapse, or nodules)
- respiratory failure not explained by heart failure or volume overload
- decreased PaO_{2}/FiO_{2} ratio (a decreased PaO_{2}/FiO_{2} ratio indicates reduced arterial oxygenation from the available inhaled gas):
  - mild ARDS: 201 – 300 mmHg (≤ 39.9 kPa)
  - moderate ARDS: 101 – 200 mmHg (≤ 26.6 kPa)
  - severe ARDS: ≤ 100 mmHg (≤ 13.3 kPa)
  - The Berlin definition requires a minimum positive end expiratory pressure (PEEP) of 5 cmH_{2}O for consideration of the PaO_{2}/FiO_{2} ratio. This degree of PEEP may be delivered noninvasively with CPAP to diagnose mild ARDS.

The 2012 "Berlin criteria" are a modification of the prior 1994 consensus conference definitions (see history).

=== Medical imaging ===
Radiologic imaging has long been a criterion for diagnosis of ARDS. Original definitions of ARDS specified that correlative chest X-ray findings were required for diagnosis, the diagnostic criteria have been expanded over time to accept CT and ultrasound findings as equally contributory. Generally, radiographic findings of fluid accumulation (pulmonary edema) affecting both lungs and unrelated to increased cardiopulmonary vascular pressure (such as in heart failure) may be suggestive of ARDS. Ultrasound findings suggestive of ARDS include the following:

- Anterior subpleural consolidations
- Absence or reduction of lung sliding
- "Spared areas" of normal parenchyma
- Pleural line abnormalities (irregular thickened fragmented pleural line)
- Nonhomogeneous distribution of B-lines (a characteristic ultrasound finding suggestive of fluid accumulation in the lungs)

== Treatment ==
Acute respiratory distress syndrome is usually treated with mechanical ventilation in the intensive care unit (ICU). Mechanical ventilation is usually delivered through a rigid tube which enters the oral cavity and is secured in the airway (endotracheal intubation), or by tracheostomy when prolonged ventilation (≥2 weeks) is necessary. The role of non-invasive ventilation is limited to the very early period of the disease or to prevent worsening respiratory distress in individuals with atypical pneumonias, lung bruising, or major surgery patients, who are at risk of developing ARDS. Treatment of the underlying cause is crucial. Appropriate antibiotic therapy is started as soon as culture results are available, or if infection is suspected (whichever is earlier). Empirical therapy may be appropriate if local microbiological surveillance is efficient. Where possible the origin of the infection is removed. When sepsis is diagnosed, appropriate local protocols are followed.

=== Mechanical ventilation ===
The overall goal of mechanical ventilation is to maintain acceptable gas exchange to meet the body's metabolic demands and to minimize adverse effects in its application. The parameters PEEP (positive end-expiratory pressure, to keep alveoli open), mean airway pressure (to promote recruitment (opening) of easily collapsible alveoli and predictor of hemodynamic effects), and plateau pressure (best predictor of alveolar overdistention) are used.

Previously, mechanical ventilation aimed to achieve tidal volumes (V_{t}) of 12–15 ml/kg (where the weight is ideal body weight rather than actual weight). Recent studies have shown that high tidal volumes can overstretch alveoli resulting in volutrauma (secondary lung injury). The ARDS Clinical Network, or ARDSNet, completed a clinical trial that showed improved mortality when people with ARDS were ventilated with a tidal volume of 6 ml/kg compared to the traditional 12 ml/kg. Low tidal volumes (V_{t}) may cause a permitted rise in blood carbon dioxide levels and collapse of alveoli because of their inherent tendency to increase shunting within the lung. Physiologic dead space cannot change as it is ventilation without perfusion. A shunt is a perfusion without ventilation within a lung region.

Low tidal volume ventilation was the primary independent variable associated with reduced mortality in the NIH-sponsored ARDSNet trial of tidal volume in ARDS. Plateau pressure less than 30 cm H_{2}O was a secondary goal, and subsequent analyses of the data from the ARDSNet trial and other experimental data demonstrate that there appears to be no safe upper limit to plateau pressure; regardless of plateau pressure, individuals with ARDS fare better with low tidal volumes.

==== Airway pressure release ventilation ====
No particular ventilator mode is known to improve mortality in acute respiratory distress syndrome (ARDS).

Some practitioners favor airway pressure release ventilation when treating ARDS. Well documented advantages to APRV ventilation include decreased airway pressures, decreased minute ventilation, decreased dead-space ventilation, promotion of spontaneous breathing, almost 24-hour-a-day alveolar recruitment, decreased use of sedation, near elimination of neuromuscular blockade, optimized arterial blood gas results, mechanical restoration of FRC (functional residual capacity), a positive effect on cardiac output (due to the negative inflection from the elevated baseline with each spontaneous breath), increased organ and tissue perfusion and potential for increased urine output secondary to increased kidney perfusion.

A patient with ARDS, on average, spends between 8 and 11 days on a mechanical ventilator; APRV may reduce this time significantly and thus may conserve valuable resources.

==== Positive end-expiratory pressure ====
Positive end-expiratory pressure (PEEP) is used in mechanically ventilated people with ARDS to improve oxygenation. In ARDS, three populations of alveoli can be distinguished. There are normal alveoli that are always inflated and engaging in gas exchange, flooded alveoli which can never, under any ventilatory regime, be used for gas exchange, and atelectatic or partially flooded alveoli that can be "recruited" to participate in gas exchange under certain ventilatory regimens. The recruitable alveoli represent a continuous population, some of which can be recruited with minimal PEEP, and others can only be recruited with high levels of PEEP. An additional complication is that some alveoli can only be opened with higher airway pressures than are needed to keep them open, hence the justification for maneuvers where PEEP is increased to very high levels for seconds to minutes before dropping the PEEP to a lower level. PEEP can be harmful; high PEEP necessarily increases mean airway pressure and alveolar pressure, which can damage normal alveoli by overdistension resulting in DAD. A compromise between the beneficial and adverse effects of PEEP is inevitable.

The 'best PEEP' used to be defined as 'some' cmH_{2}O above the lower inflection point (LIP) in the sigmoidal pressure-volume relationship curve of the lung. Recent research has shown that the LIP-point pressure is no better than any pressure above it, as recruitment of collapsed alveoli—and, more importantly, the overdistension of aerated units—occur throughout the whole inflation. Despite the awkwardness of most procedures used to trace the pressure-volume curve, it is still used by some to define the minimum PEEP to be applied to their patients. Some new ventilators can automatically plot a pressure-volume curve.

PEEP may also be set empirically. Some authors suggest performing a 'recruiting maneuver'—a short time at a very high continuous positive airway pressure, such as 50 cmH_{2}O (4.9 kPa)—to recruit or open collapsed units with a high distending pressure before restoring previous ventilation. The final PEEP level should be the one just before the drop in PaO_{2} or peripheral blood oxygen saturation during a step-down trial. A large randomized controlled trial of patients with ARDS found that lung recruitment maneuvers and PEEP titration was associated with high rates of barotrauma and pneumothorax and increased mortality.

Intrinsic PEEP (iPEEP) or auto-PEEP—first described by John Marini of St. Paul Regions Hospital—is a potentially unrecognized contributor to PEEP in intubated individuals. When ventilating at high frequencies, its contribution can be substantial, particularly in people with obstructive lung disease such as asthma or chronic obstructive pulmonary disease (COPD). iPEEP has been measured in very few formal studies on ventilation in ARDS, and its contribution is largely unknown. Its measurement is recommended in the treatment of people who have ARDS, especially when using high-frequency (oscillatory/jet) ventilation.

=== Prone position ===
The position of lung infiltrates in acute respiratory distress syndrome is non-uniform. Repositioning into the prone position (face down) might improve oxygenation by relieving atelectasis and improving perfusion. If this is done early in the treatment of severe ARDS, it confers a mortality benefit of 26% compared to supine ventilation. However, attention should be paid to avoid the SIDS in the management of the respiratory distressed infants by continuous careful monitoring of their cardiovascular system.

=== Fluid management ===
Several studies have shown that pulmonary function and outcome are better in people with ARDS who lost weight or whose pulmonary wedge pressure was lowered by diuresis or fluid restriction.

=== Medications ===
As of 2019, it is uncertain whether or not treatment with corticosteroids improves overall survival. Corticosteroids may increase the number of ventilator-free days during the first 28 days of hospitalization. One study found that dexamethasone may help. The combination of hydrocortisone, ascorbic acid, and thiamine also requires further study as of 2018.

Inhaled nitric oxide (NO) selectively widens the lung's arteries which allows for more blood flow to open alveoli for gas exchange. Despite evidence of increased oxygenation status, there is no evidence that inhaled nitric oxide decreases morbidity and mortality in people with ARDS. Furthermore, nitric oxide may cause kidney damage and is not recommended as therapy for ARDS regardless of severity.

Alvelestat (AZD 9668) had been quoted according to one review article.

=== Extracorporeal membrane oxygenation ===
Extracorporeal membrane oxygenation (ECMO) is mechanically applied prolonged cardiopulmonary support. There are two types of ECMO: Venovenous which provides respiratory support and venoarterial which provides respiratory and hemodynamic support. People with ARDS who do not require cardiac support typically undergo venovenous ECMO. Multiple studies have shown the effectiveness of ECMO in acute respiratory failure. Specifically, the CESAR (Conventional ventilatory support versus Extracorporeal membrane oxygenation for Severe Acute Respiratory failure) trial demonstrated that a group referred to an ECMO center demonstrated significantly increased survival compared to conventional management (63% to 47%).

=== Ineffective treatments ===
As of 2019, there is no evidence showing that treatments with exogenous surfactants, statins, beta-blockers or n-acetylcysteine decreases early mortality, late all-cause mortality, duration of mechanical ventilation, or number of ventilator-free days.

== Prognosis ==
The overall prognosis of ARDS is poor, with mortality rates of approximately 40%. Exercise limitation, physical and psychological sequelae, decreased physical quality of life, and increased costs and use of health care services are important sequelae of ARDS.

== Epidemiology ==
The annual rate of ARDS is generally 13–23 people per 100,000 in the general population. It is more common in people who are mechanically ventilated with acute lung injury (ALI) occurring in 16% of ventilated people. Rates increased in 2020 due to COVID-19, with some cases also appearing similar to HAPE.

Worldwide, severe sepsis is the most common trigger causing ARDS. Other triggers include mechanical ventilation, sepsis, pneumonia, Gilchrist's disease, drowning, circulatory shock, aspiration, trauma—especially pulmonary contusion—major surgery, massive blood transfusions, smoke inhalation, drug reaction or overdose, fat emboli and reperfusion pulmonary edema after lung transplantation or pulmonary embolectomy. However, the majority of patients with all these conditions mentioned do not develop ARDS. It is unclear why some people with the mentioned factors above do not develop ARDS and others do.

Pneumonia and sepsis are the most common triggers, and pneumonia is present in up to 60% of patients and may be either causes or complications of ARDS. Alcohol excess appears to increase the risk of ARDS. Diabetes was originally thought to decrease the risk of ARDS, but this has shown to be due to an increase in the risk of pulmonary edema. Elevated abdominal pressure of any cause is also probably a risk factor for the development of ARDS, particularly during mechanical ventilation.

== History ==
Acute respiratory distress syndrome was first described in 1967 by Ashbaugh et al. Initially there was no clearly established definition, which resulted in controversy regarding the incidence and death of ARDS.

In 1988, an expanded definition was proposed, which quantified physiologic respiratory impairment.

=== 1994 American-European Consensus Conference ===
In 1994, a new definition was recommended by the American-European Consensus Conference Committee which recognized the variability in severity of pulmonary injury.

The definition required the following criteria to be met:

- acute onset, persistent dyspnea
- bilateral infiltrates on chest radiograph consistent with pulmonary edema
- hypoxemia, defined as PaO_{2}:FiO_{2} < 200 mmHg (26.7 kPa)
- absence of left atrial (LA) hypertension
  - pulmonary artery wedge pressure < 18 mmHg (obtained by pulmonary artery catheterization)
  - if no measured LA pressure available, there must be no other clinical evidence to suggest elevated left heart pressure.

If PaO_{2}:FiO_{2} < 300 mmHg (40 kPa), then the definitions recommended a classification as "acute lung injury" (ALI). Note that according to these criteria, arterial blood gas analysis and chest X-ray were required for formal diagnosis. Limitations of these definitions include lack of precise definition of acuity, nonspecific imaging criteria, lack of precise definition of hypoxemia with regards to PEEP (affects arterial oxygen partial pressure), arbitrary PaO_{2} thresholds without systematic data.

=== 2012 Berlin definition ===
In 2012, the Berlin Definition of ARDS was devised by the European Society of Intensive Care Medicine, and was endorsed by the American Thoracic Society and the Society of Critical Care Medicine. These recommendations were an effort to both update classification criteria in order to improve clinical usefulness and to clarify terminology. Notably, the Berlin guidelines discourage the use of the term "acute lung injury" or ALI, as the term was commonly being misused to characterize a less severe degree of lung injury. Instead, the committee proposes a classification of ARDS severity as mild, moderate, or severe according to arterial oxygen saturation. The Berlin definitions represent the current international consensus guidelines for both clinical and research classification of ARDS.

== Terminology ==
ARDS is the severe form of acute lung injury (ALI), and of transfusion-related acute lung injury (TRALI), though there are other causes. The Berlin definition included ALI as a mild form of ARDS. However, the criteria for the diagnosis of ARDS in the Berlin definition excludes many children, and a new definition for children was termed pediatric acute respiratory distress syndrome (PARDS); this is known as the PALICC definition (2015).

== Research directions ==
There is ongoing research on the treatment of ARDS by interferon (IFN) beta-1a to aid in preventing leakage of vascular beds. Traumakine (FP-1201-lyo) is a recombinant human IFN beta-1a drug, developed by the Finnish company Faron Pharmaceuticals, which is undergoing international phase-III clinical trials after an open-label, early-phase trial showed an 81% reduction-in-odds of 28-day mortality in ICU patients with ARDS. The drug is known to function by enhancing lung CD73 expression and increasing production of anti-inflammatory adenosine, such that vascular leaking and escalation of inflammation are reduced.

Aspirin has been studied in those who are at high risk and was not found to be useful.

An intravenous ascorbic acid treatment was tested in the 2019 RCT, in people with ARDS due to sepsis and there was no change in primary endpoints.

== See also ==
- Respiratory monitoring
