= Oxygen index =

Oxygen index may refer to:

- Oxygenation index in medicine
- In chemistry, the ratio of oxygen (atoms) over hydrogen in a particular substance, such as used in a Van Krevelen diagram

== See also ==
- Limiting oxygen index
