= Lung recruitment maneuver =

Efforts to open collapsed areas of the lungs and keep them open

- Other names: Recruitment maneuvers
- Specialty: Respirology

Lung recruitment maneuvers are efforts to open collapsed areas of the lungs and keep them open. They are primarily used in acute respiratory distress syndrome (ARDS).
