= Radiation-induced lung injury =

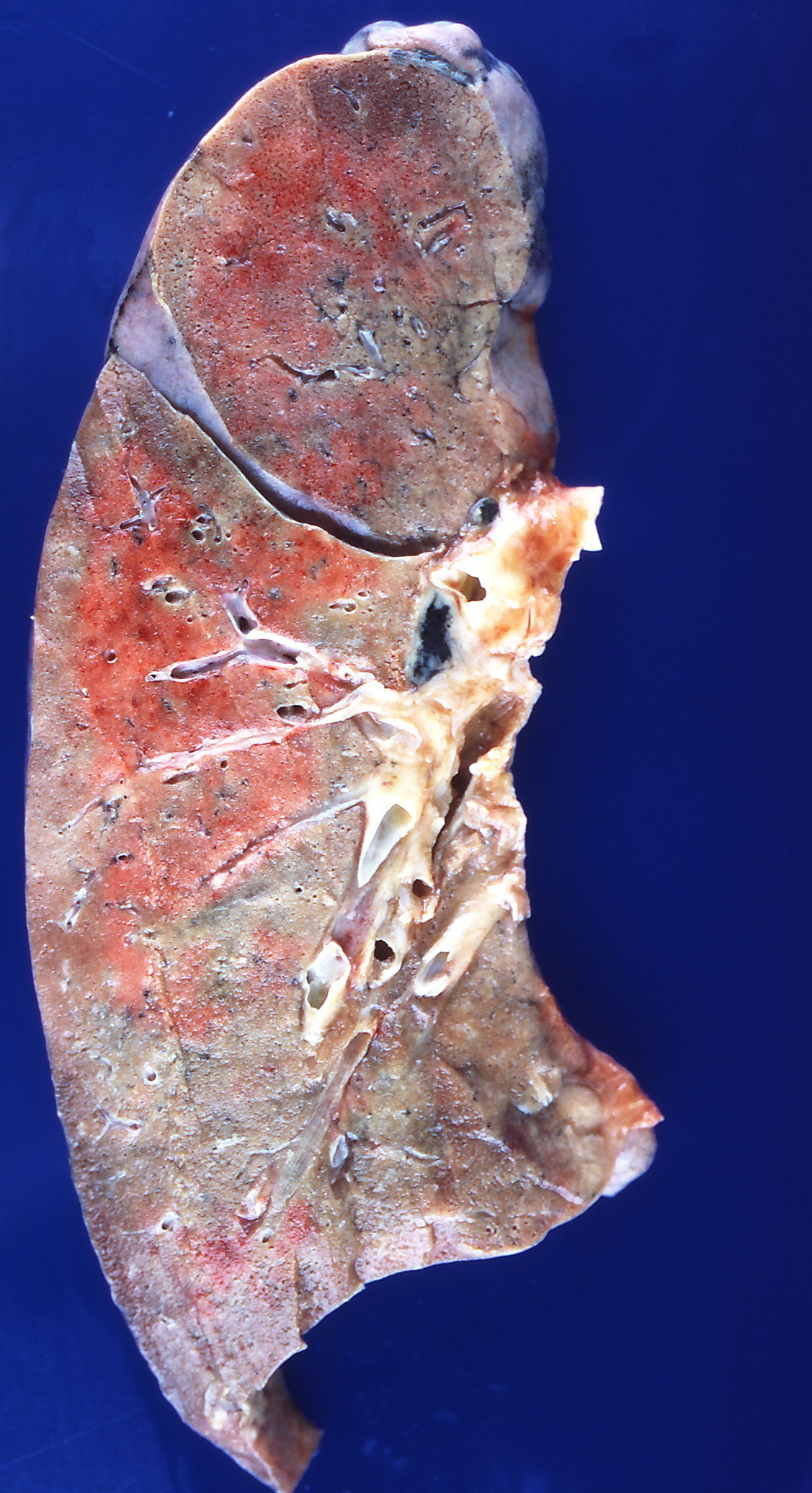
- Radiation pneumonitis
- Specialty: Pulmonology

Radiation-induced lung injury (RILI) is a general term for damage to the lungs as a result of exposure to ionizing radiation. In general terms, such damage is divided into early inflammatory damage (radiation pneumonitis) and later complications of chronic scarring (radiation fibrosis). Pulmonary radiation injury is an unavoidable risk of radiation therapy administered to treat thoracic or lung cancer.

== Symptoms and signs ==
The lungs are a radiosensitive organ, and radiation pneumonitis can occur leading to pulmonary insufficiency and death (100% after exposure to 50 gray of radiation) in a few months. Radiation pneumonitis is characterized by:

- Loss of epithelial cells
- Edema
- Inflammation
- Occlusions airways, air sacs and blood vessels
- Fibrosis

Symptoms of radiation pneumonitis include: fever, cough, chest congestion, shortness of breath, chest pain

== Diagnosis ==
High resolution CT thorax

== Treatment ==
“The Canadian Cancer society mentions these things that help to manage radiation.

Your healthcare team may recommend medicines to treat radiation pneumonitis, such as:

- decongestants
- cough suppressants
- bronchodilators
- corticosteroids to reduce inflammation
- oxygen therapy

You can also try the following to help manage symptoms:

Rest if you feel short of breath.

Drink more fluids and use a cool-air vaporizer or humidifier to keep the air moist. Use an extra pillow to raise your head and upper body while resting or sleeping. Avoid the outdoors on hot, humid days or very cold days (which can irritate the lungs). Wear light, loose-fitting tops and avoid anything tight around the neck, such as ties or shirt collars.“

== See also ==
- Radiation poisoning
