= Permissive hypercapnia =

Hypercapnia in respiratory insufficiency

Permissive hypercapnia is hypercapnia (i.e. high concentration of carbon dioxide in blood) in respiratory insufficient patients in which oxygenation has become so difficult that the optimal mode of mechanical ventilation (with oxygenation in mind) is not capable of exchanging enough carbon dioxide. Carbon dioxide is a gaseous product of the body's metabolism and is normally expelled through the lungs.

In acute respiratory distress syndrome (ARDS), decreasing the tidal volume on the ventilator (usually 6-8 mL/kg) to 4-6 mL/kg may decrease barotrauma by decreasing ventilatory peak airway pressures and leads to improved respiratory recovery. Hypercapnia (increased pCO_{2}) sometimes needs to be tolerated in order to achieve these lower tidal volumes. The permissive hypercapnia leads to respiratory acidosis which might have negative side effects, but given that the patient is in ARDS, improving ventilatory function is more important.

Since hypoxemia is a major life-threatening condition and hypercapnia is not, one might choose to accept the latter. Hence the term, "permissive hypercapnia."

== Symptoms ==
Symptoms of early hypercapnia (i.e. where PaCO_{2} is elevated but not extremely so) include flushed skin, full pulse, extrasystoles, muscle twitches, hand flaps, and possibly a raised blood pressure. In severe hypercapnia (generally PaCO_{2} greater than 10 kPa or 75 mmHg), symptomatology progresses to disorientation, panic, hyperventilation, convulsions, unconsciousness, and eventually death.

Other description about permissive hypercapnia in ARDS patient

Mechanical ventilation using high tidal volume (VT) and transpulmonary pressure can damage the lung, causing ventilator-induced lung injury. Permissive hypercapnia, a ventilatory strategy for acute respiratory failure in which the lungs are ventilated with a low inspiratory volume and pressure, has been accepted progressively in critical care for adult, pediatric, and neonatal patients requiring mechanical ventilation and is one of the central components of current protective ventilatory strategies.

== See also ==
- Acute respiratory distress syndrome
- Mechanical ventilation
