= Diffuse alveolar damage =

Non-fatal disease of the lungs

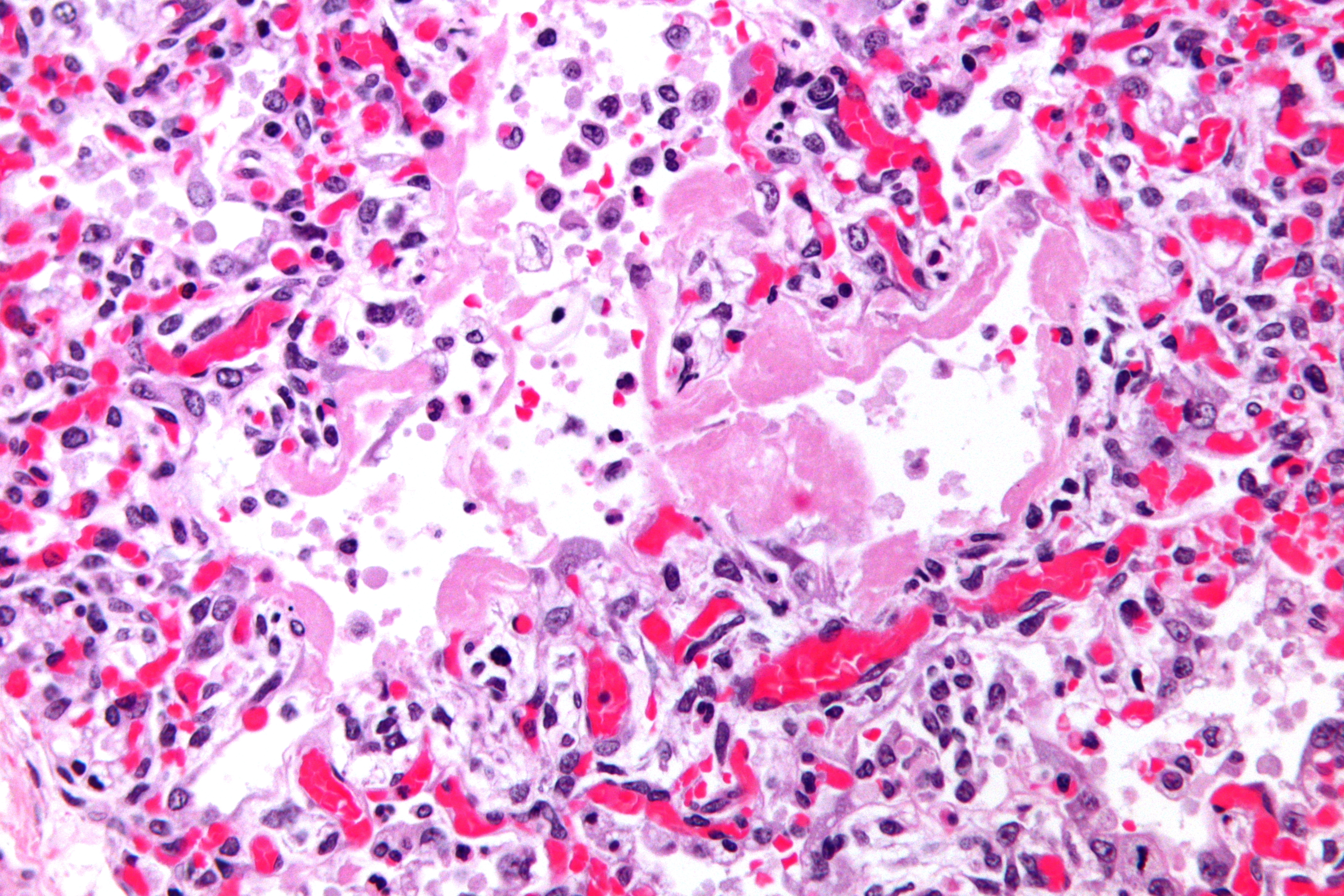
- Micrograph showing hyaline membranes, the key histologic feature of diffuse alveolar damage. H&E stain.
- Specialty: Respirology

Diffuse alveolar damage (DAD) is a histologic term used to describe specific changes that occur to the structure of the lungs during injury or disease. Most often DAD is described in association with the early stages of acute respiratory distress syndrome (ARDS). DAD can be seen in situations other than ARDS (such as acute interstitial pneumonia) and that ARDS can occur without DAD.

== Definitions ==
- Diffuse alveolar damage (DAD): an acute lung condition with the presence of hyaline membranes. These hyaline membranes are made up of dead cells, surfactant, and proteins. The hyaline membranes deposit along the walls of the alveoli, where gas exchange typically occurs, thereby making gas exchange difficult.
- Acute respiratory distress syndrome (ARDS): a potentially life-threatening condition where the alveoli are damaged thereby letting fluid leak into the lungs which makes it difficult to exchange gases and oxygenate the blood. It is the general practice of the medical community to use the Berlin criteria to diagnose ARDS. All criteria must be present to make a diagnosis of ARDS.

=== Berlin Criteria: as stated on UpToDate (2020) ===
The Berlin Criteria specifies:

1. Timing: onset of respiratory symptoms within one week of an injury/insult.
2. Chest Imaging: either chest x-ray or CT scan, must show bilateral opacities that cannot be fully explained by other conditions such as effusion, lung/lobar collapse, or lung nodules.
3. Origin of Edema: respiratory failure that cannot be fully explained by cardiac failure or fluid overload, this needs objective assessment such as an echocardiogram.
4. Impaired Oxygenation: this can be determined by looking at the ratio of arterial oxygen tension to fraction of inspired oxygen (PaO_{2}/FiO_{2}) that can be obtained based on an arterial blood gas test. Note: all PaO_{2}/FiO_{2} ratios used in the determination of the severity of ARDS require that the patient be on a ventilator at a setting that includes 5 cm H_{2}O or more of positive end-expiratory pressure (PEEP) or continuous positive airway pressure (CPAP).

Level of ARDS	PaO_{2}/FiO_{2} Range	PEEP/CPAP
Mild ARDS	201–300	≥5 cm H_{2}O
Moderate ARDS	101–200	≥5 cm H_{2}O
Severe ARDS	<100	≥5 cm H_{2}O

== Histology/Progression ==
The epithelial lining of alveoli are composed of two different types of cells. Alveolar type I epithelial cells comprise about 80% of the alveolar surface area and are primarily responsible for gas exchange. Alveolar type II epithelial cells play the critical roles of producing surfactant, moving water out of the airspaces, and regenerating alveolar epithelium. The alveolar type II epithelial cells are more resistant to damage, so after an insult to the alveoli, most of the damage will occur to the alveolar type I epithelial cells.

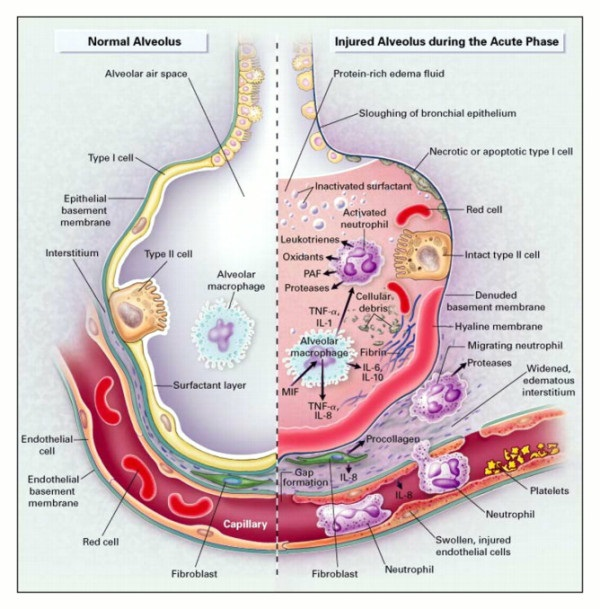
Left side demonstrate the structure of a normal alveolus including the difference between type I and type II alveolar epithelial cells. Right side depicts what occurs after injury to the alveolus during the acute/exudative phase.

Once the initial insult has damaged the alveoli and begun the process of DAD, the condition will typically progress in three phases: exudative, proliferative, and fibrotic. Below are the description of the phases, paraphrased from Sweeney et al. (2016).

- Exudative Phase (1–7 days): After the initial insult to the alveoli, immune cells (neutrophils and macrophages) are recruited to the alveoli, which can cause more damage through their nonspecific defensive mechanisms. Since the epithelial lining is damaged it allows plasma and proteins to leak in to the airspace, accumulating fluid (otherwise known as edema). Additionally, since the epithelial lining is damaged there is limited ability to pump this edema out of the airspace and back in to the interstitium. The presence of this edema has the following detrimental impacts:
  - The edema contributes to the deposition of a hyaline membrane (composed of dead cells, surfactant, and proteins) along the alveolar walls. Hyaline membranes are characteristic of DAD.
  - The edema interferes with the naturally occurring surfactant, which is critical for reducing surface tension and allowing alveoli to remain open and allow air in for gas exchange.
- Proliferative/Organizing Phase (1–3 weeks): This phase is characterized by recovery. The epithelial lining is repopulated with alveolar type II epithelial cells which will eventually differentiate into alveolar type I epithelial cells. While the type II epithelial cells are repopulating the epithelial surface they are also performing the critical task of transporting the edema out of the airspace and back into the interstitium. Meanwhile, in the airspace, macrophages are clearing cellular debris.
- Fibrotic Phase (after 3 weeks, if occurs): not all courses of DAD result in a fibrotic phase. This phase occurs if the alveolar collagen that is deposited during the acute exudative phase fails to be resorbed, resulting in limitations of alveolar expanse and subsequently gas exchange.

== Causes/Mechanism ==
DAD can occur in settings other than ARDS and that ARDS can occur with histology other than DAD. That being said, the histologic finding of DAD is often associated with the clinical syndrome ARDS but it can also be seen in conditions such as acute interstitial pneumonia (essentially ARDS but without a known inciting cause), acute exacerbation of idiopathic pulmonary fibrosis, and primary graft dysfunction after lung transplant. The most common causes of ARDS are pneumonia, non-pulmonary sepsis, and aspiration.

To reiterate, the hallmark of DAD is hyaline membrane formation. There is a similar process which occurs in newborns called hyaline membrane disease, although the preferred term is surfactant-deficiency disorder, that also has the formation of hyaline membranes. This disorder typically develops due to prematurity, especially when the infant is delivered prior to 36 weeks since surfactant doesn't start being produced until 35 weeks gestation. The lack of surfactant causes alveolar collapse and subsequent damage to the epithelial lining of the alveoli, causing the same path of damage described in the above section.

== Diagnosis ==
In order to make a diagnosis of DAD a biopsy of the lung must be obtained, processed, and examined microscopically. As described above, the hallmark of diagnosing DAD is the presence of hyaline membranes. Most frequently DAD is associated with ARDS, but since there are clinical criteria (see Berlin criteria above) upon which we can diagnose ARDS, it is often unnecessary in all cases to obtain invasive biopsies of the lung. Additionally, there are limitations of the biopsy test since it is possible to sample a potentially normal area of lung even though there is DAD in the rest of the lung, resulting in a false negative.

== Treatment ==
The most important factor for treating DAD or ARDS is to treat the underlying cause of the injury to the lungs, for example pneumonia or sepsis. These patients will have problems with oxygenation, meaning they will likely need a breathing tube, medications to keep them comfortable (sedative, paralytic, and/or analgesic), and a mechanical ventilator to breathe for them. The mechanical ventilator will often be set to a setting of at least 5 cm H_{2}O of positive end-expiratory pressure (PEEP) to keep the alveoli from collapsing during exhalation. Other treatments to improve oxygenation may include prone positioning or extracorporeal membrane oxygenation (ECMO).

== Prognosis ==
As expected, the mortality rates increase as the severity of the ARDS increases with mortality rates at approximately 35%, 40%, and 46% for mild, moderate, and severe, respectively. It has been revealed that patients with ARDS that show DAD on histology are at a high mortality rate of 71.9% compared to 45.5% in patients with ARDS but without DAD. Of the patients who succumb to ARDS, the most common cause of death is septic shock with multi organ dysfunction syndrome.

Among survivors upon discharge, many will have impairments in their lung function. The majority (approximately 80%) of patient will have decrease diffusion capacity while fewer patients (approximately 20%) will have issues with airflow (either obstructive or restrictive). These airflow issues will typically resolve within six months and the diffusion issues will resolve within five years.
