= Oxygenation index =

Calculation used to measure oxygen in humans

The oxygenation index is a calculation used in intensive care medicine to measure the fraction of inspired oxygen (FiO2) and its usage within the body.

A lower oxygenation index is better - this can be inferred by the equation itself. As the oxygenation of a person improves, they will be able to achieve a higher PaO2 at a lower FiO2. This would be reflected on the formula as a decrease in the numerator or an increase in the denominator - thus lowering the OI. Typically an OI threshold is set for when a neonate should be placed on ECMO, for example >40.

== Equation ==
$OI = \frac{Fi\ce{O2} \times M_\text{PAW}}{Pa\ce{O2}}$

- $Fi\ce{O2}$: Fraction of inspired oxygen, in percent;
- $M_\text{PAW}$: Mean airway pressure, in mmHg;
- $Pa\ce{O2}$: Partial pressure of oxygen in arterial blood, in mmHg.
