= United States Military Academy =

U.S. Army federal service academy in West Point, New York

- Motto: Duty • Honor • Country
- Type: U.S. Service Academy
- Established: 16 March 1802; 224 years ago
- Founder: Thomas Jefferson
- Endowment: $590.6 million (2025)
- Superintendent: James B. Bartholomees III
- Dean: Nicholas H. Gist
- Commandant of Cadets: Joseph A. Katz
- Faculty: 580
- Students: 4,294 cadets
- Location: West Point, New York, United States
- Campus: Rural – 16,080 acres (6,507.3 ha)
- Fight song: On, Brave Old Army Team
- Colors: Black, gold, and gray
- Nickname: Black Knights
- Sporting affiliations: NCAA Division I – PL; AHA CSFL EIGL EIWA NCA The American
- Mascot: Mule
- Website: westpoint.edu
- United States Military Academy
- U.S. National Register of Historic Places
- U.S. National Historic Landmark
- New York State Register of Historic Places
- Location within New York Location within the United States
- Coordinates: 41°23′33″N 73°57′27″W
- NRHP reference No.: 66000562
- NYSRHP No.: 07103.000261

Significant dates
- Added to NRHP: 15 October 1966
- Designated NHL: 19 December 1960
- Designated NYSRHP: 23 June 1980

The United States Military Academy (USMA), commonly known as West Point, is a United States service academy in West Point, New York, that educates cadets for service as commissioned officers in the United States Army. The academy was founded in 1802, and it is the oldest of the five American service academies. The Army has occupied the site since establishing a fort there in 1780 during the American Revolutionary War, as it sits on strategic high ground overlooking the Hudson River 50 miles (80 km) north of New York City.

West Point's academic program grants the Bachelor of Science degree with a curriculum that grades cadets' performance upon a broad academic program, military leadership performance, and mandatory participation in competitive athletics. Candidates for admission must apply directly to the academy and receive a nomination, usually from a member of Congress. Students are officers-in-training with the rank of cadet. Collectively, the students at the academy are the "United States Corps of Cadets" (USCC). The Army fully funds tuition for cadets in exchange for an active duty service obligation upon graduation. About 1,300 cadets enter the academy each July, with about 1,000 cadets graduating. The academy began admitting female cadets in 1976, and women now make up around 20% of entrants. The academy's traditions have influenced other institutions because of its age and unique mission. It was the first American college to have an accredited civil engineering program, and its technical curriculum became a model for engineering schools. It was also the first college to have class rings.

West Point fields 15 men's and nine women's National Collegiate Athletic Association (NCAA) sports teams. Cadets compete in one sport every fall, winter, and spring season at the intramural, club, or intercollegiate level. Its football team was a national power in the early and mid-20th century, winning three national championships. Its alumni are collectively referred to as "The Long Gray Line" and include U.S. presidents Dwight D. Eisenhower and Ulysses S. Grant; Confederate president Jefferson Davis; Confederate generals Robert E. Lee and Stonewall Jackson; American poet Edgar Allan Poe (did not graduate but was court-martialed for intentional neglect of duties); U.S. generals William Tecumseh Sherman, John J. Pershing, Douglas MacArthur, Omar Bradley, and George Patton; presidents of Costa Rica, Nicaragua, and the Philippines; and 76 Medal of Honor recipients.

== History ==
=== Colonial period, founding, and early years ===
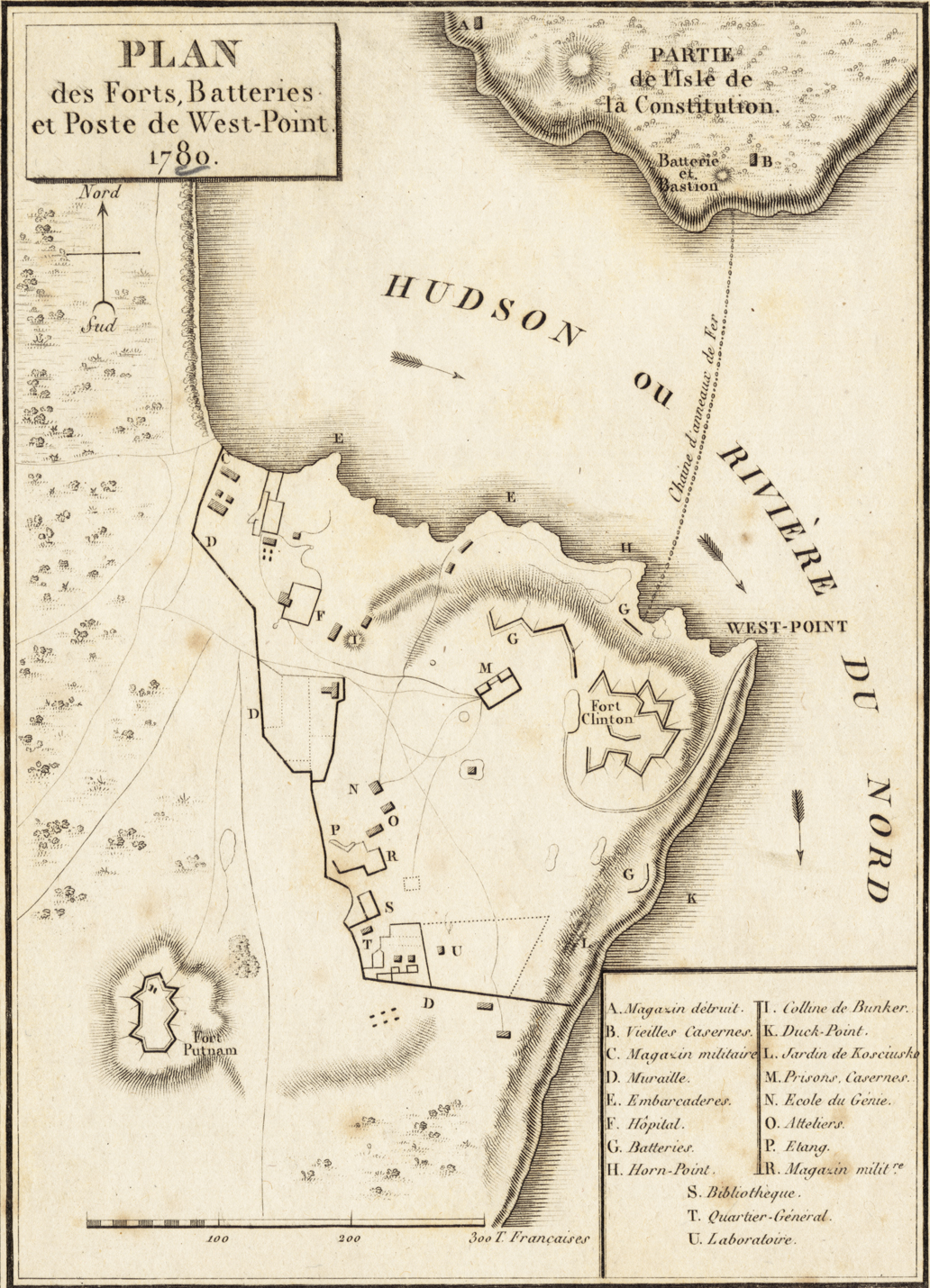
French map of West Point in 1780

The Continental Army first occupied West Point, New York, on 27 January 1778, and it is the oldest continuously operating Army post in the United States. Between 1778 and 1780, the Polish engineer and military hero Tadeusz Kościuszko oversaw the construction of the garrison defenses. However, Kościuszko's plan of a system of small forts did not meet with the approval of New York Governor (and General) George Clinton or the other general officers. It was determined that a battery along the river to "annoy the shipping" was more appropriate, and Washington's chief engineer, Rufus Putnam, directed the construction of a major fortification on a hill 500 feet (150 m) above sea level that commanded the West Point plain. General Alexander McDougall named it Fort Putnam. The Great Hudson River Chain and high ground above the narrow "S" curve in the river enabled the Continental Army to prevent the Royal Navy from sailing upriver and dividing Patriot forces in the Northern colonies from the south. While the fortifications at West Point were known as Fort Arnold during the war, as commander, Benedict Arnold committed his act of treason, attempting to turn the fort over to the British. After Arnold betrayed the patriot cause, the Army changed the name of the fortifications at West Point, New York, to Fort Clinton, named after General James Clinton. With the peace after the American Revolutionary War, various ordnance and military stores were left deposited at West Point.

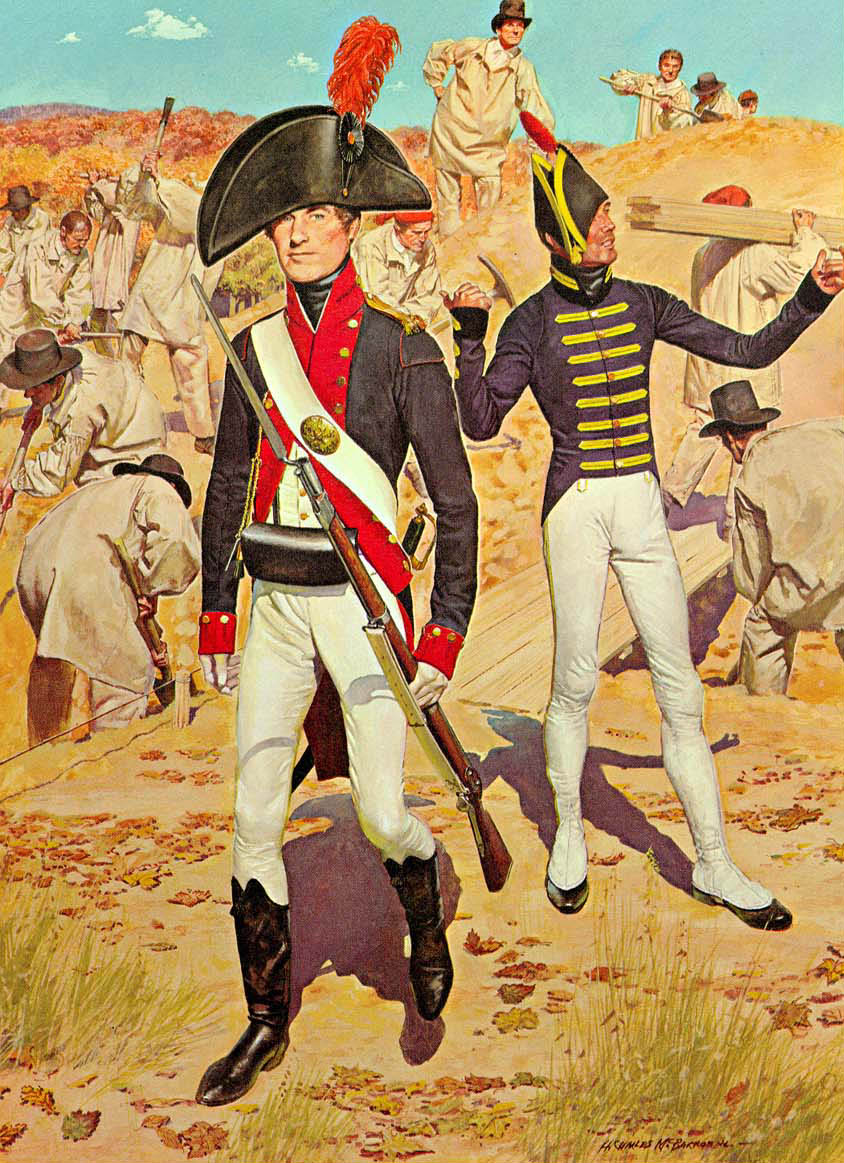
Artillery cadet in 1805, wearing a mixture of commissioned and non-commissioned uniforms prescribed for artillery cadets

"Cadets" underwent training in artillery and engineering studies at the garrison since 1794. During the Quasi-War, Alexander Hamilton laid out plans for the establishment of a military academy at West Point and introduced "A Bill for Establishing a Military Academy" in the House of Representatives. In 1801, shortly after his inauguration as president, Thomas Jefferson directed that plans be set in motion to establish at West Point the United States Military Academy. He selected Jonathan Williams to serve as its first superintendent. Congress formally authorized the establishment and funding of the school with the Military Peace Establishment Act of 1802, which Jefferson signed on 16 March. The academy officially commenced operations on 4 July 1802. The academy graduated Joseph Gardner Swift, its first official graduate, in October 1802. He later returned as Superintendent from 1812 to 1814. In its tumultuous early years, the academy featured few standards for admission or length of study. Cadets ranged in age from 10 years to 37 years and attended between 6 months to 6 years. The impending War of 1812 caused the United States Congress to authorize a more formal system of education at the academy and increased the size of the Corps of Cadets to 250.

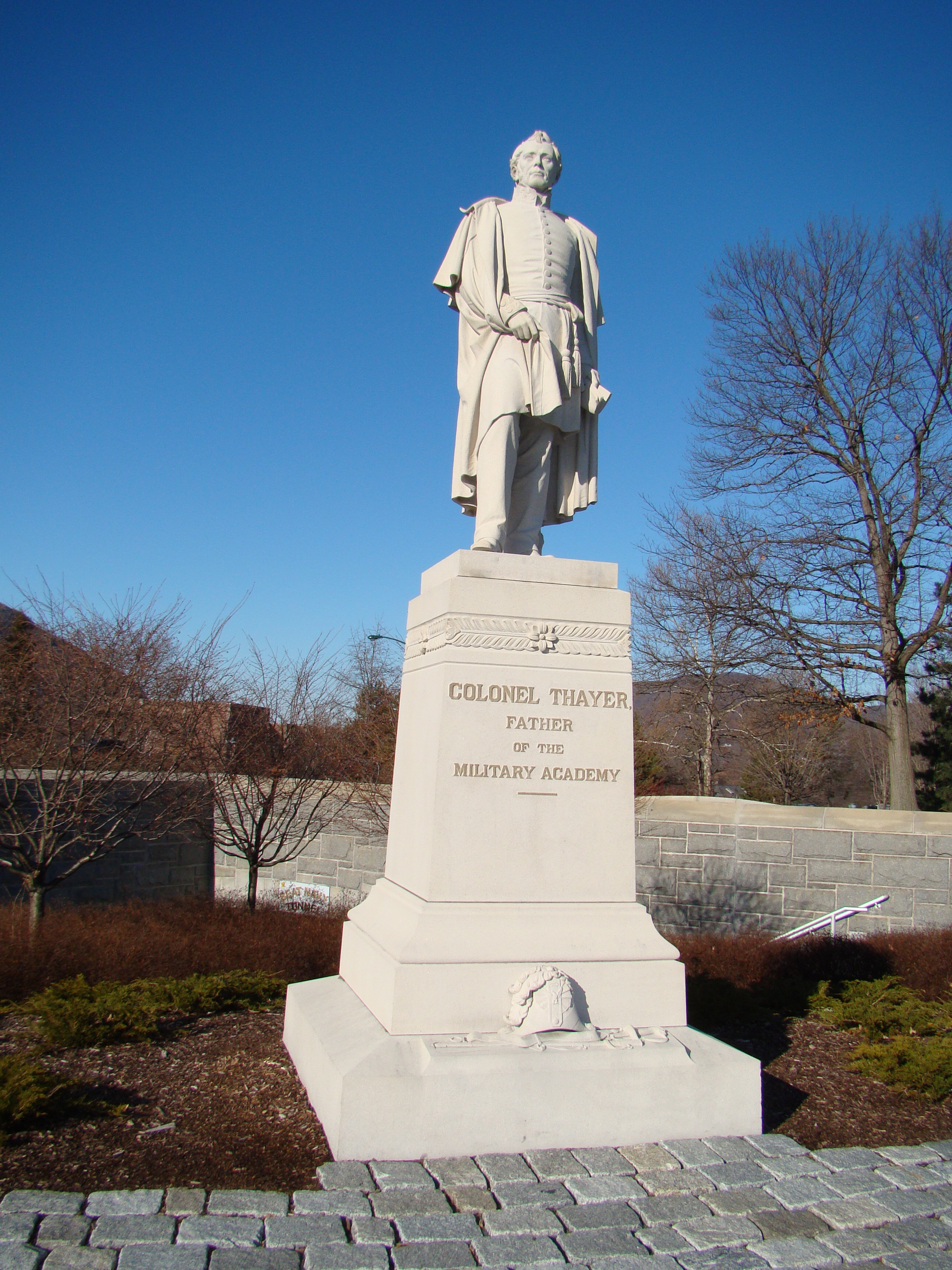
Monument to Superintendent Thayer

In 1817, Colonel Sylvanus Thayer became the Superintendent and established the curriculum, elements of which are still in use as of 2020. Thayer instilled strict disciplinary standards, set a standard course of academic study, and emphasized honorable conduct. He was very much inspired by the curriculum of the French École polytechnique, where he had been sent upon his demand, for two years in order to study the scientific and technological achievements developed by the French Republican faction and bring them back to the United States. Known as the "Father of the Military Academy," he is honored with a monument on campus for the profound impact he had on the academy. Founded as a school of engineering, for the first half of the 19th century, USMA produced graduates who gained recognition for engineering the bulk of the nation's initial railway lines, bridges, harbors, and roads. The academy was the only engineering school in the country until the founding of Rensselaer Polytechnic Institute in 1824. It was so successful in its engineering curriculum that it significantly influenced every American engineering school founded prior to the Civil War.

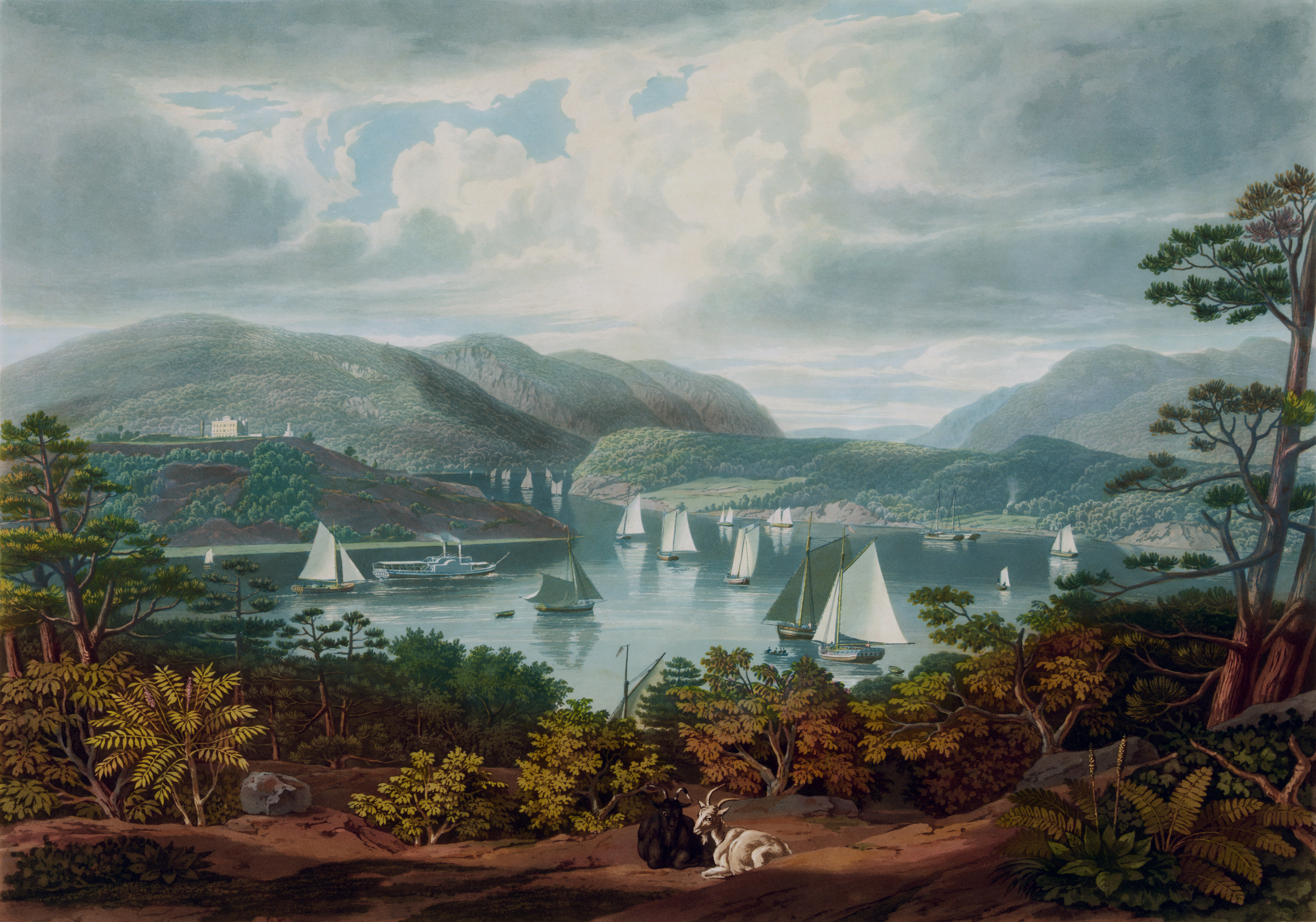
West Point, from Phillipstown (1831), engraving by W. J. Bennett showing the original buildings of the United States Military Academy

In 1835, during the Army's first year of the Second Seminole War, they had only three generals: Winfield Scott, Edmund P. Gaines, and Thomas S. Jesup. The Army's remaining fourteen generals held only brevet ranks, and none of them were West Point graduates. Nearly the only way to obtain a commission up to 1835 was through the academy, which raised loud complaints and added to the deep desire of the era's Jacksonian Democracy "to get rid of the Academy, where Jacksonians were sure, an aristocratic tradition was being bred."

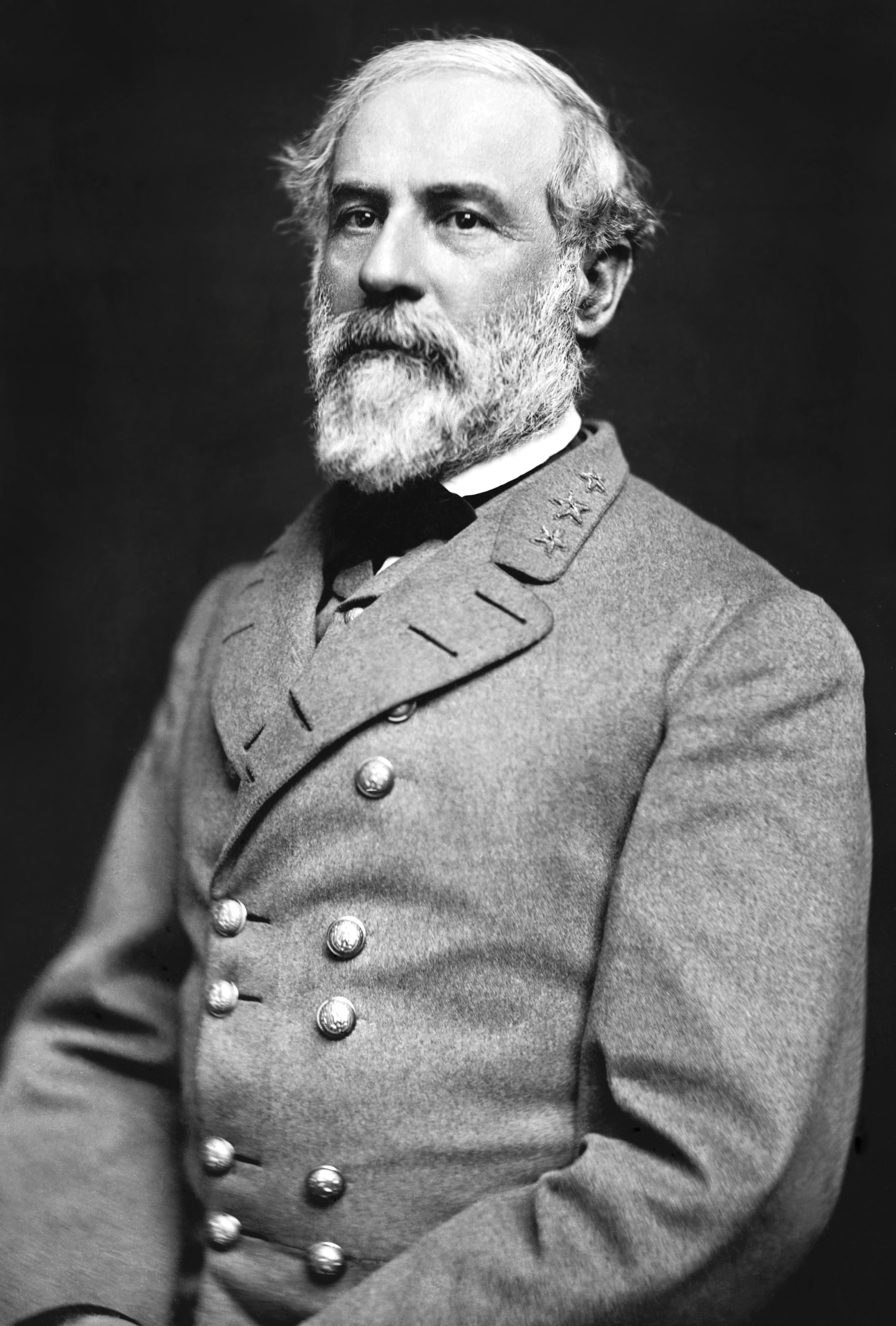
Robert E. Lee, American Civil War general who graduated from West Point in 1829, and served as its superintendent from 1852 to 1855

The Mexican–American War brought the academy to prominence as graduates proved themselves in battle for the first time. Future Civil War commanders Ulysses S. Grant and Robert E. Lee, who also later became the superintendent of the academy, first distinguished themselves in battle in Mexico. In all, 452 of 523 graduates who served in the war received battlefield promotions or awards for bravery. The school experienced a rapid modernization during the 1850s, often romanticized by the graduates who led both sides of the Civil War as the "end of the Old West Point era." New barracks brought better heat and gas lighting, while new ordnance and tactics training incorporated new rifle and musket technology and accommodated transportation advances created by the steam engine. With the outbreak of the Civil War, West Point graduates filled the general officer ranks of the rapidly expanding Union and Confederate armies. 294 graduates served as general officers for the Union, and 151 served as general officers for the Confederacy. Of all living graduates at the time of the war, 105 (10%) were killed, and another 151 (15%) were wounded. Nearly every general officer of note from either army during the Civil War was a graduate of West Point, and a West Point graduate commanded the forces of one or both sides in every one of the 60 major battles of the war.

=== After the Civil War ===
Immediately following the Civil War, the academy enjoyed unprecedented fame as a result of the role its graduates had played. The post-war years were a difficult time for the academy as it struggled to admit and reintegrate cadets from former Confederate states. The first cadets from Southern states were re-admitted in 1868, and 1870 saw the admission of the first black cadet, James Webster Smith of South Carolina. Smith endured harsh treatment and was eventually dismissed for academic deficiency under controversial circumstances in 1874. As a result, Henry O. Flipper of Georgia became the first black graduate in 1877, graduating 50th in a class of 76. Two of the most notable graduates during this period were George Washington Goethals from the class of 1880 and John J. Pershing from the class of 1886. Goethals gained prominence as the chief engineer of the Panama Canal, and Pershing would become famous for his exploits against the famed Pancho Villa in Mexico and later for leading American Forces during World War I. In 1898, the first Confederate leader since the Civil War was invited to the academy.

Besides the integration of southern-state and black cadets, the post-war academy also struggled with the issue of hazing. In its first 65 years, hazing was uncommon or non-existent beyond small pranks played upon the incoming freshmen, but it took a harsher tone as Civil War veterans began to fill the incoming freshman classes. The upper-class cadets saw it as their duty to "teach the plebes their manners." Hazing at the academy entered the national spotlight with the death of former cadet Oscar L. Booz on 3 December 1900. Congressional hearings, which included testimony by cadet Douglas MacArthur, investigated his death and the pattern of freshmen's systemic hazing. When MacArthur returned as superintendent, he made an effort to end the practice of hazing the incoming freshmen by placing Army sergeants in charge of training new cadets during freshman summer. The practice of hazing continued on some levels well into the late 20th century, but is no longer allowed in the present day.

The demand for junior officers during the Spanish–American War caused the class of 1899 to graduate early, and the Philippine–American War did the same for the class of 1901. This increased demand for officers led Congress to increase the Corps of Cadets' size to 481 cadets in 1900. The period between 1900 and 1915 saw a construction boom as much of West Point's old infrastructure was rebuilt. Many of the academy's most famous graduates graduated during the 15 years between 1900 and 1915: Douglas MacArthur (1903), Joseph Stilwell (1904), Henry "Hap" Arnold (1907), George S. Patton (1909), Dwight D. Eisenhower, and Omar Bradley (both 1915). The class of 1915 is known as "the class the stars fell on" for the exceptionally high percentage of general officers that rose from that class (59 of 164).

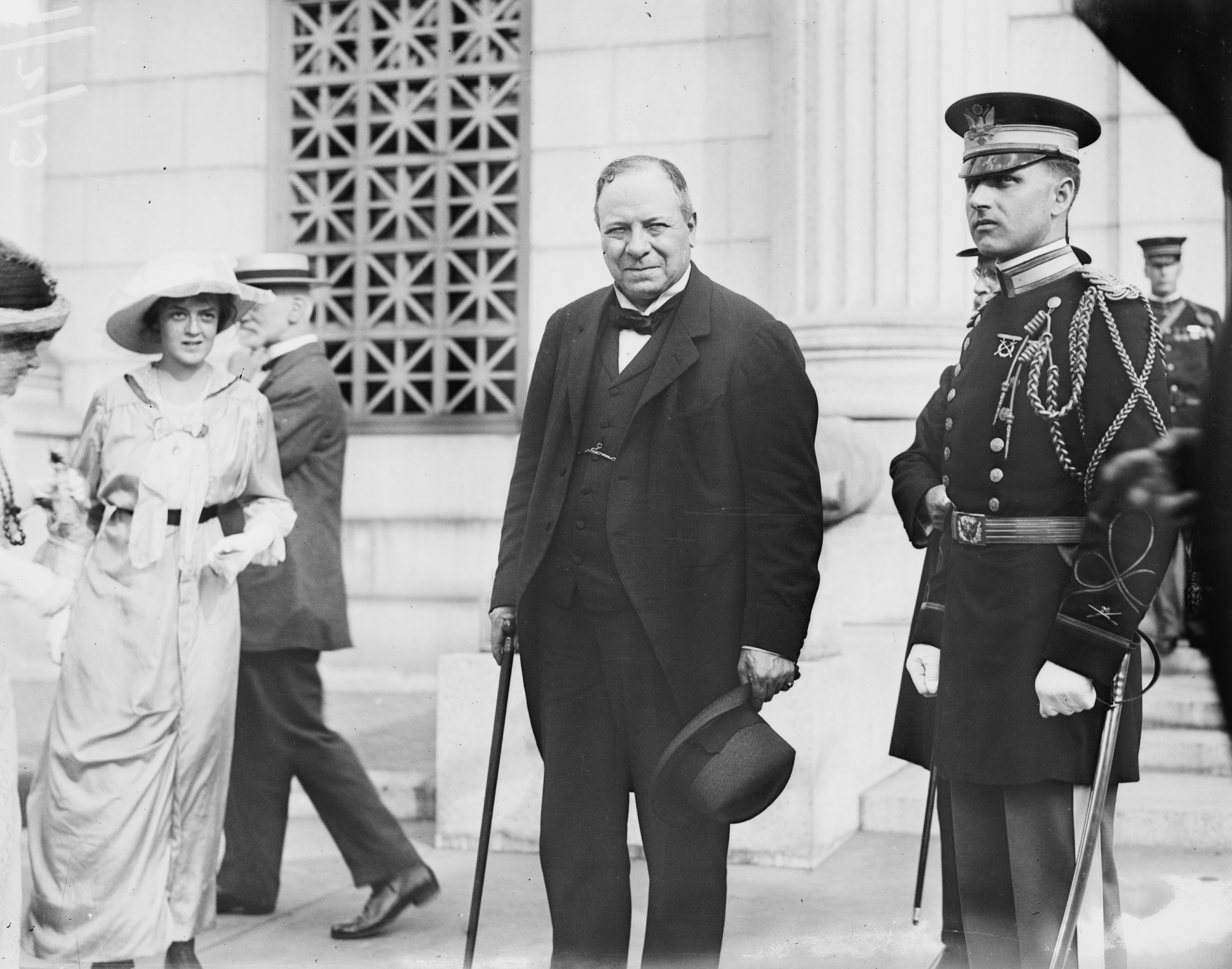
U.K. secretary for war Richard Haldane, author of the Haldane Reforms of the British military, at West Point sometime before World War I

The outbreak of America's involvement in World War I caused a sharp increase in the demand for army officers, and the academy accelerated graduation of all four classes then in attendance to meet this requirement, beginning with the early graduation of the First Class on 20 April 1917, the Second Class in August 1917, and both the Third and Fourth Classes just before the Armistice of 11 November 1918, when only freshman cadets remained (those who had entered in the summer of 1918). In all, wartime contingencies and post-war adjustments resulted in ten classes, varying in length of study from two to four years, within a seven-year period before the regular course of study was fully resumed.

Douglas MacArthur became superintendent in 1919, instituting sweeping reforms to the academic process, including introducing a greater emphasis on history and humanities. He made major changes to the field training regimen, and the Cadet Honor Committee was formed under his watch in 1922. MacArthur was a firm supporter of athletics at the academy, as he famously said, "Upon the fields of friendly strife are sown the seeds that, upon other fields, on other days, will bear the fruits of victory." West Point was first officially accredited in 1925, and in 1933 began granting Bachelor of Science degrees to all graduates. In 1935, the academy's authorized strength increased to 1,960 cadets.

=== World War II and the Cold War ===
As World War II engulfed Europe, Congress authorized an increase to 2,496 cadets in 1942 and began graduating classes early. The class of 1943 graduated six months early in January 1943, and the next four classes graduated after only three years. To accommodate this accelerated schedule, summer training was formally moved to a recently acquired piece of land southwest of the main post. The site would later become Camp Buckner. The academy had its last serious brush with abolition or major reform during the war, when some members of Congress charged that even the accelerated curriculum allowed young men to "hide out" at West Point and avoid combat duty. A proposal was put forth to convert the academy to an officer's training school with a six-month schedule, but this was not adopted. West Point played a prominent role in WWII; four of the five, five-star generals were alumni, and nearly 500 graduates died. Immediately following the war in 1945, Maxwell Taylor (class of 1922) became superintendent. He expanded and modernized the academic program and abolished antiquated courses in fencing and horsemanship.

Unlike previous conflicts, the Korean War did not disrupt class graduation schedules. More than half of the Army leadership during the war comprised West Point graduates. The Class of 1950, which graduated only two weeks prior to the war's outbreak, suffered some of the heaviest casualties of any 20th-century class and became known sourly as "the class the crosses fell on." A total of 157 alumni perished in the conflict. Garrison H. Davidson became superintendent in 1956 and instituted several reforms that included refining the admissions process, changing the core curriculum to include electives, and increasing the academic degree standards for academy instructors. The 1960s saw the size of the Corps expand to 4,400 cadets while the barracks and academic support structure grew proportionally.

West Point was not immune to the social upheaval of American society during the Vietnam War. The first woman joined the faculty of the all-male institution amidst controversy in 1968. West Point granted its first honorable discharge in 1971 to an African-American West Point cadet, Cornelius M. Cooper, of California, who applied for conscientious objector status in 1969. The academy struggled to fill its incoming classes as its graduates led troops in Southeast Asia, where 333 graduates died.

=== Modern era ===
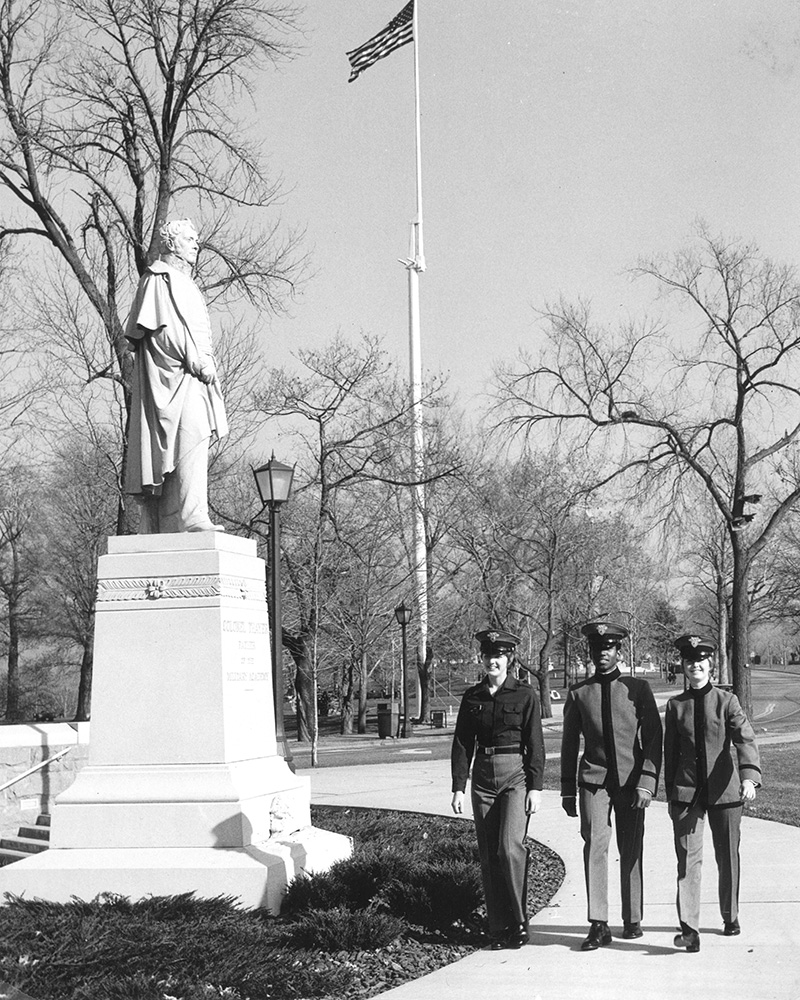
Women were first admitted to the academy in 1976 for the Class of 1980. Pictured are three cadets from that class in December 1976

Following the 1973 end of American involvement in Vietnam, the strain and stigma of earlier social unrest dissolved, and West Point enjoyed surging enrollments. On 20 May 1975, an amendment to the Defense Authorization Bill of 1976 opening the service academies to women was approved by the House of Representatives, 303–96. The Senate followed suit on 6 June. President Ford signed the bill on 7 October 1975.

West Point admitted its first 119 female cadets in 1976. That same year, physics professor James H. Stith became the first tenured African American Professor. In 1979, Cadet, later General, Vincent K. Brooks became the first African American to lead the Corps of Cadets. Kristin Baker, ten years later, became the first female First Captain, the highest-ranking senior cadet at the academy in 1989. Seven other women have been appointed as First Captain: Grace H. Chung in 2003, Stephanie Hightower in 2005, Lindsey Danilack in 2013, Simone Askew in 2017, Reilly McGinnis in 2020, Lauren Drysdale in 2022, and Caroline Robinson in 2025. Simone Askew was the first African American woman to lead the Corps. In the 21st century, women comprise approximately 20% of entering new cadets.

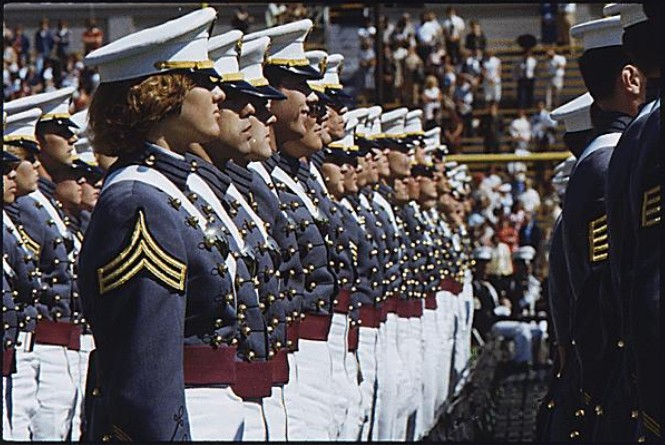
First female graduates in 1980

In 1985, cadets were formally authorized to declare an academic major; all previous graduates had been awarded a general Bachelor of Science degree. Five years later there was a major revision of the Fourth-Class System, as the Cadet Leader Development System (CLDS) became the guidance for the development of all four classes. The class of 1990 was the first one to be issued a standard and mandatory computer to every member of the class at the beginning of Plebe year, the Zenith 248 SX. The academy was also an early adopter of the Internet in the mid-1990s and was recognized in 2006 as one of the nation's "most wired" campuses.

During the Gulf War, alumnus General Schwarzkopf was the commander of Allied Forces. The American senior generals in Iraq, Generals Petraeus, Odierno and Austin, and Afghanistan, retired General Stanley McChrystal and General David Rodriguez, are also alumni. Following the September 11 attacks, applications for admission to the academy increased dramatically, security on campus was increased, and the curriculum was revamped to include coursework on terrorism and military drills in civilian environments. One graduate was killed during the 9/11 terrorist attacks and ninety graduates have died during operations in Afghanistan, Iraq, and the ongoing global war on terror. The Class of 2005 has been referred to as The Class of 9/11 as the attacks occurred during their first year at the academy, and they graduated 911 students. In 2008 gender-neutral lyrics were incorporated into West Point's "Alma Mater" and "The Corps" – replacing lines like "The men of the Corps" with "The ranks of the Corps." In December 2009, President Barack Obama delivered a major speech in Eisenhower Hall Theater outlining his policy for deploying 30,000 additional troops to Afghanistan as well as setting a timetable for withdrawal. President Obama also provided the commencement address in 2014.

After the Don't Ask, Don't Tell policy was lifted 20 September 2011, the academy began admitting and retaining openly gay cadets. By March 2012, cadets were forming a gay-straight alliance group called Spectrum. By March 2015, Spectrum had two faculty and 40 cadet members, a mixture of gay, straight, bi, and undecided. According to a Vanity Fair essay, the LGBT cadets were well accepted. After the ban on transgender service members was lifted in 2016, the Class of 2017 saw the first openly transgender graduate. However, she was denied a commission and was honorably discharged.

Brig. Gen. Diana Holland became West Point's first woman Commandant of Cadets in January 2016.

In 2020, the campus confronted its first major pandemic in a century, with the COVID-19 pandemic causing limitations on classes, and the relocation of the traditional Army-Navy football game to ensure social distancing. For the first time in many years, the 121st iteration of the game was held at West Point rather than the traditional Lincoln Financial Field in Philadelphia. Ultimately, West Point beat Navy 15–0.

== Campus ==
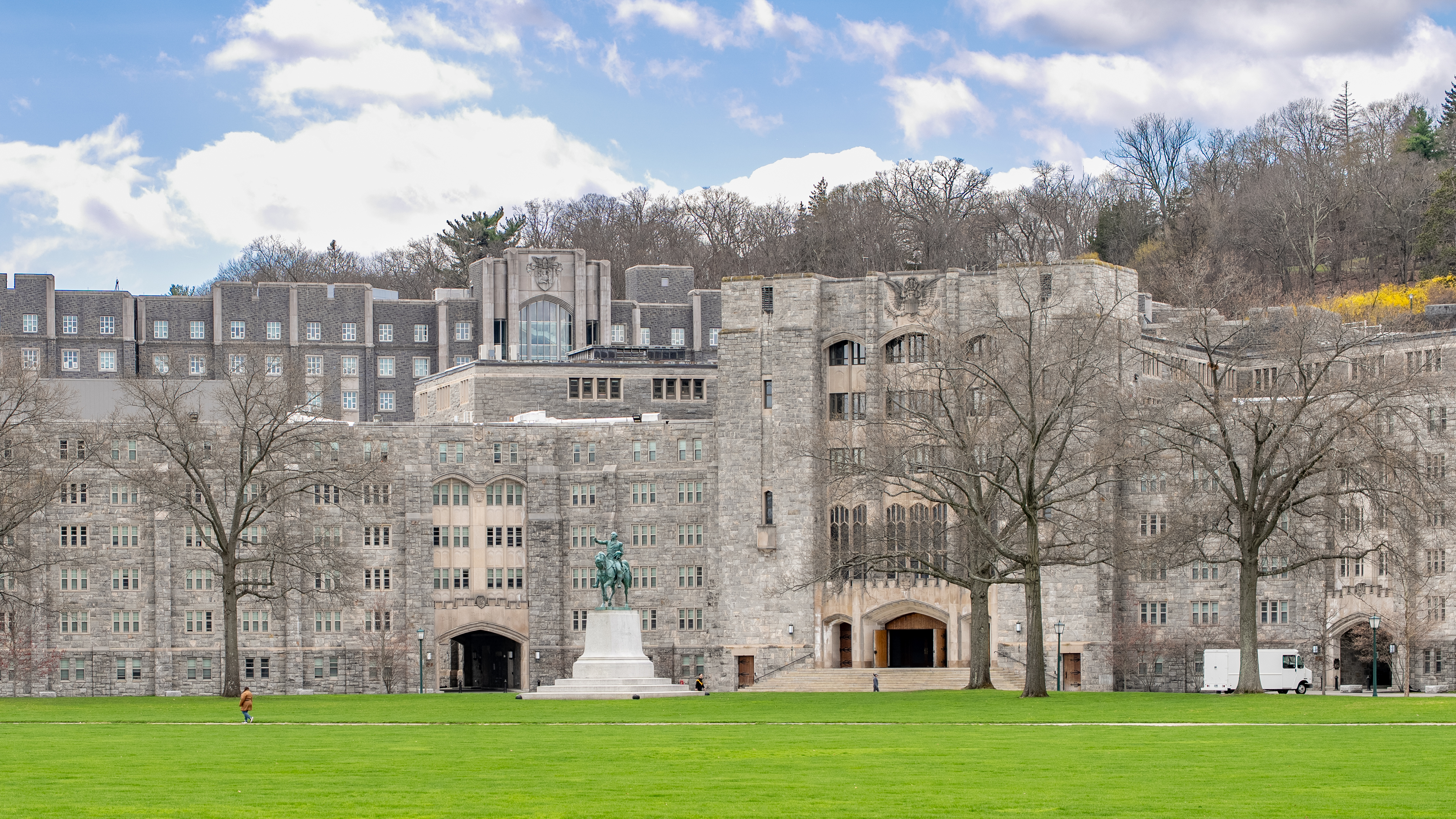
Washington Monument and Washington Hall as seen from The Plain

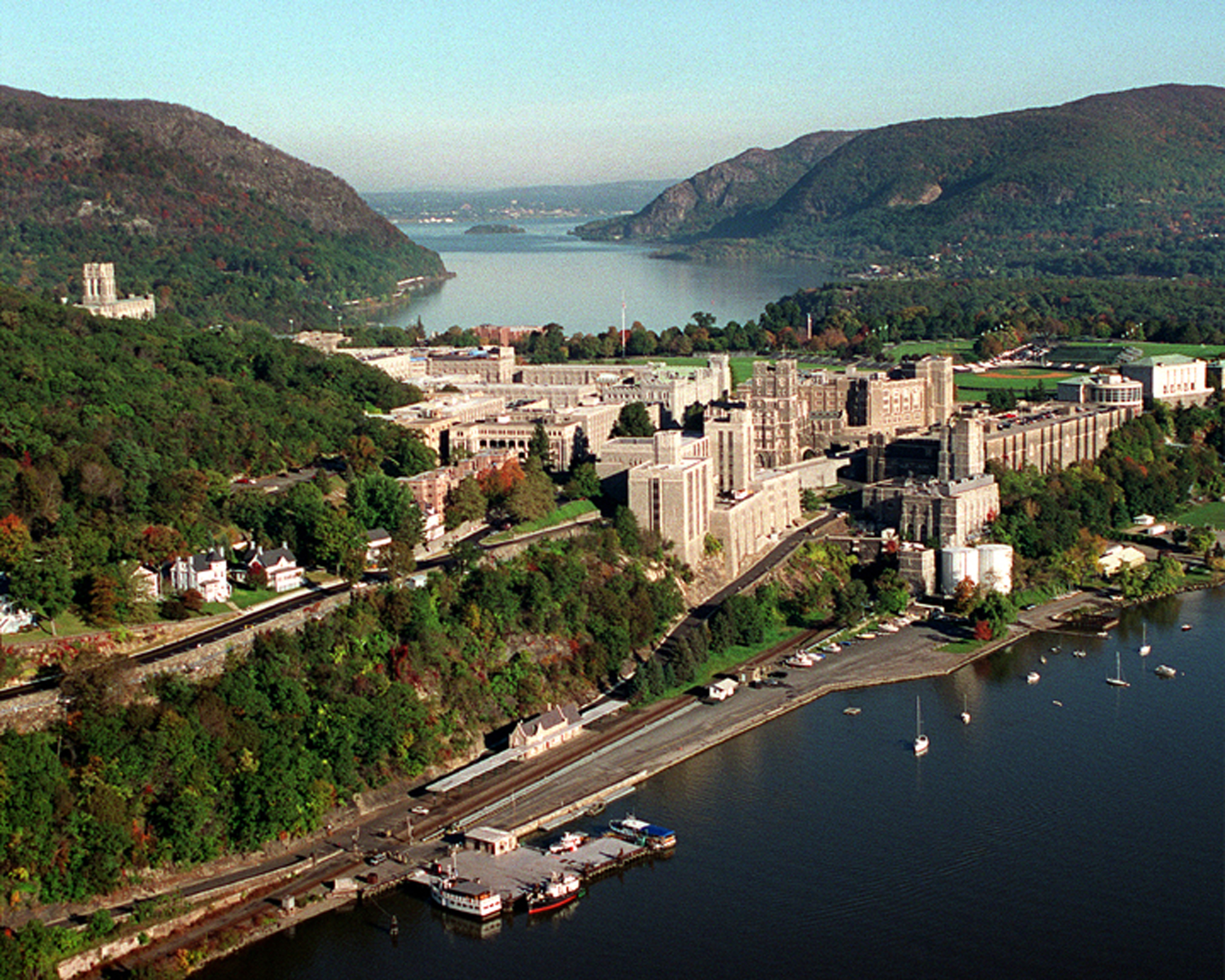
Looking north from the Hudson River toward the central campus, located in the Hudson Highlands

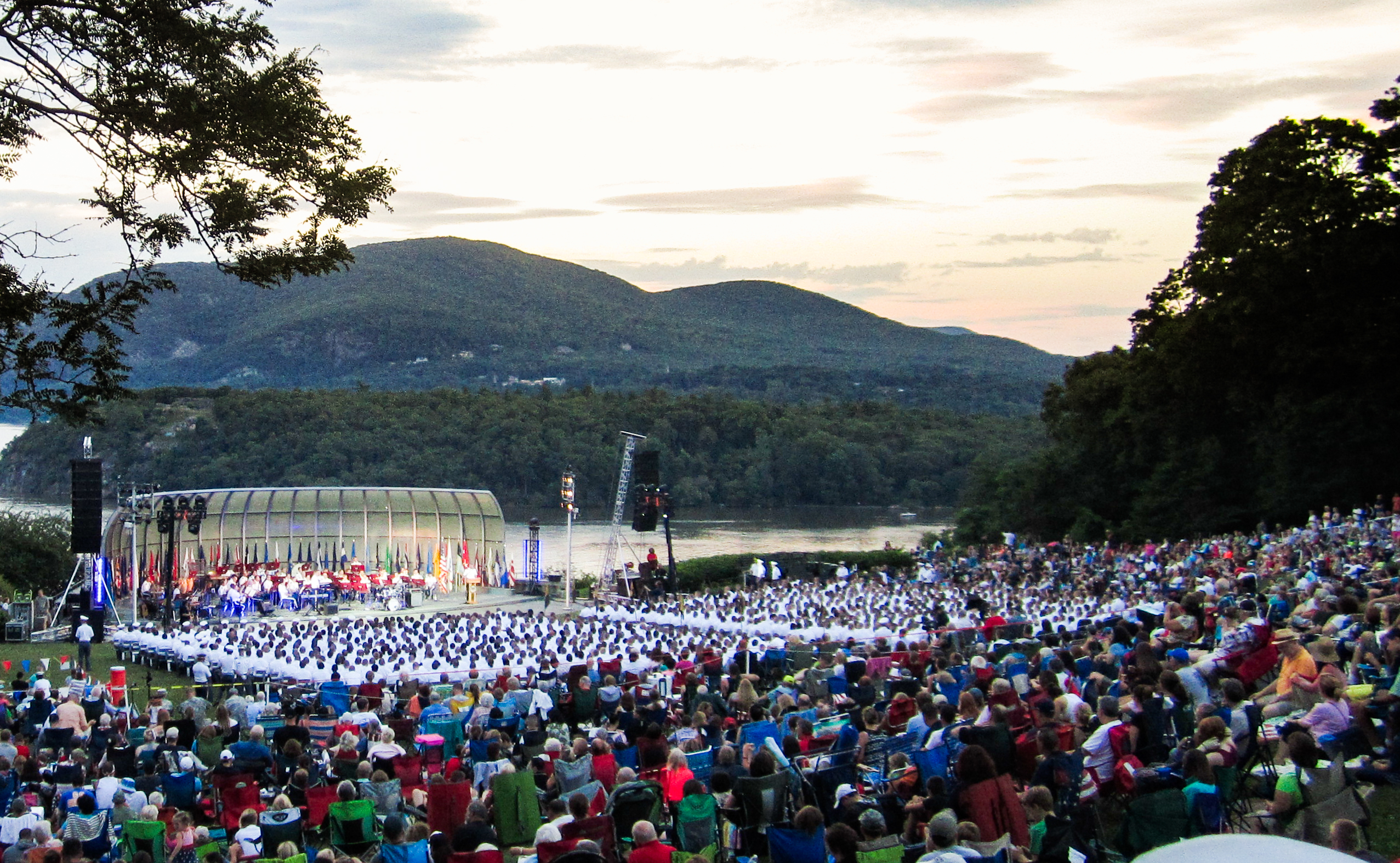
The Trophy Point Amphitheater hosts cadet ceremonies as well as free summer concerts.

The academy is located approximately 50 miles (80 km) north of New York City on the western bank of the Hudson River. West Point, New York, is incorporated as a federal military reservation in Orange County and is adjacent to Highland Falls. Based on the significance both of the Revolutionary War fort ruins and of the military academy itself, the majority of the academy area was declared a National Historic Landmark in 1960. In 1841, Charles Dickens visited the academy and said "It could not stand on more appropriate ground, and any ground more beautiful can hardly be." One of the most visited and scenic sites on post, Trophy Point, overlooks the Hudson River to the north, and is home to many captured cannon from past wars as well as the Stanford White-designed Battle Monument. Though the entire military reservation encompasses 15,974 acres (65 km^{2}), the academic area of the campus, known as "central area" or "the cadet area", is entirely accessible to cadets or visitors by foot.

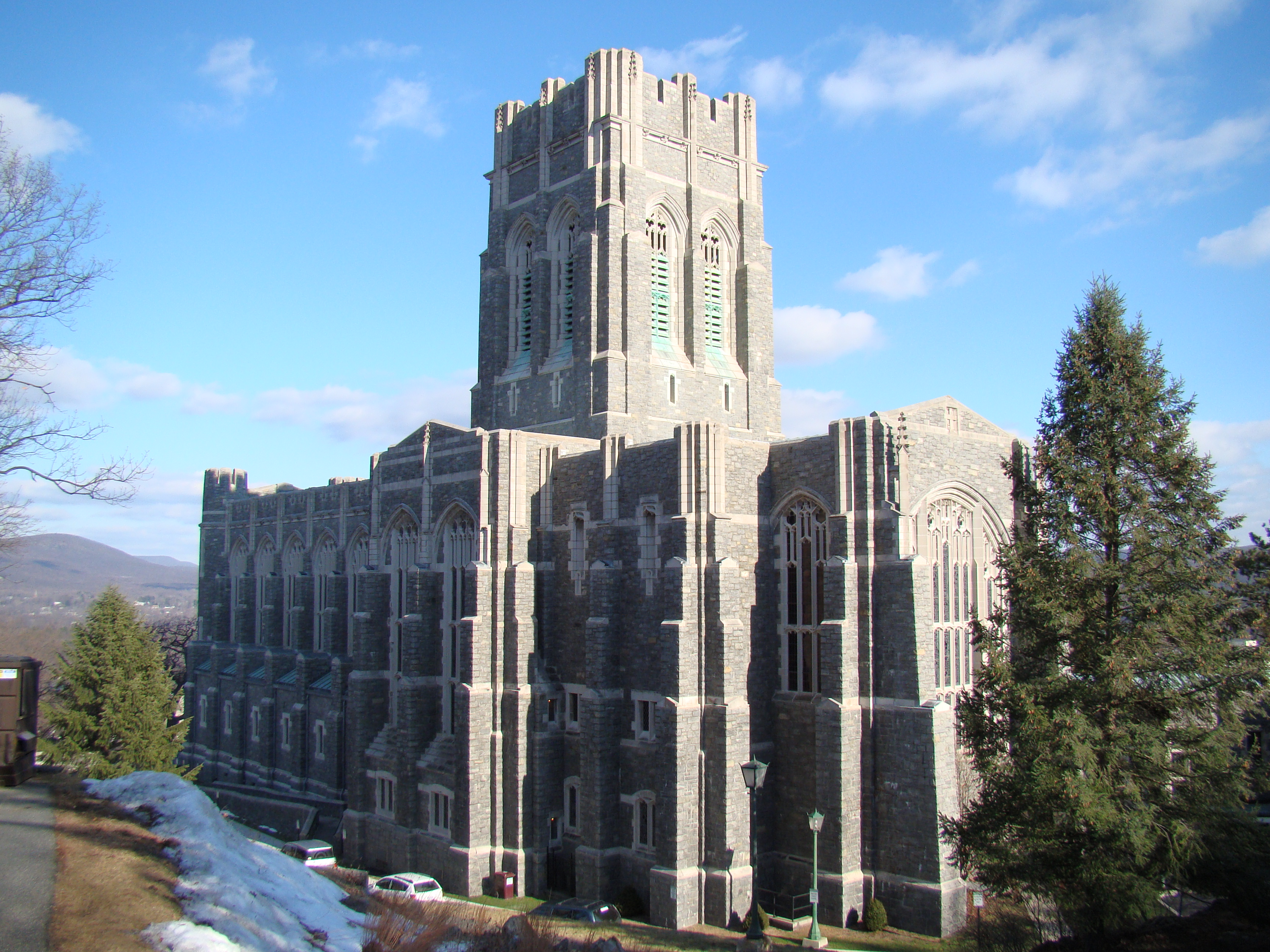
Cadet Chapel

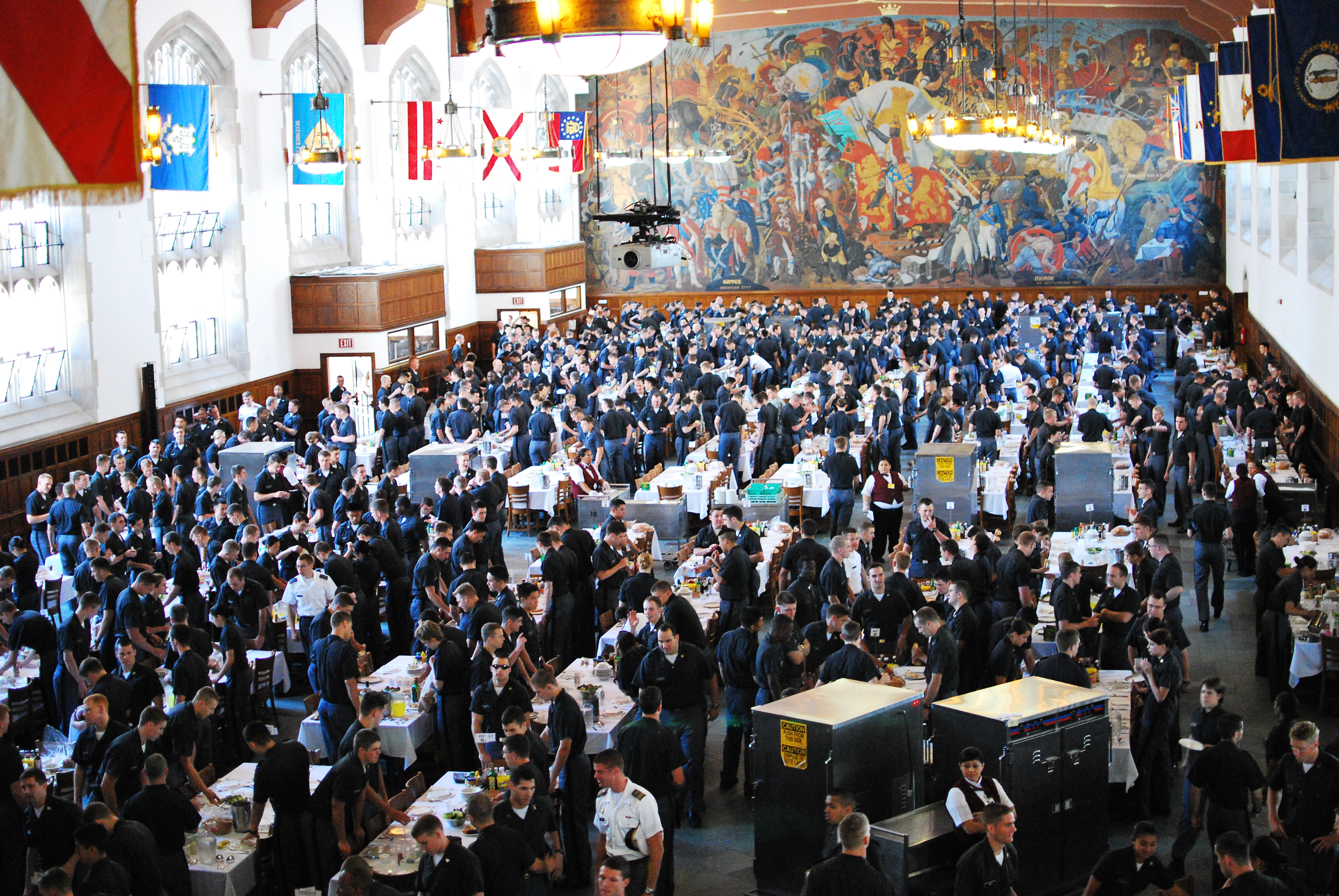
One of the six wings of Washington Hall during lunchtime

In 1902, the Boston architectural firm Cram, Goodhue, and Ferguson was awarded a major construction contract that set the predominantly neogothic architectural style still seen today. Most of the buildings of the central cadet area are in this style, as typified by the Cadet Chapel, completed in 1910. These buildings are nearly all constructed from granite that has a predominantly gray and black hue. The barracks that were built in the 1960s were designed to mimic this style. Other buildings on post, notably the oldest private residences for the faculty, are built in the Federal, Georgian, or English Tudor styles. A few buildings, such as Cullum Hall and the Old Cadet Chapel, are built in the Neoclassical style.

The academy grounds are home to numerous monuments and statues. The central cadet parade ground, the Plain, hosts the largest number, and includes the Washington Monument, Thayer Monument, Eisenhower Monument, MacArthur Monument, Kosciuszko Monument, and Sedgwick Monument. Patton Monument was first dedicated in front of the cadet library in 1950, but in 2004 it was placed in storage to make room for the construction of Jefferson Hall. With the completion of Jefferson Hall, Patton's statue was relocated and unveiled at a temporary location on 15 May 2009, where it will remain until the completion of the renovation of the old cadet library and Bartlett Hall. There is also a statue commemorating brotherhood and friendship from the École polytechnique in the cadet central area just outside Nininger Hall. The remaining campus area is home to 27 other monuments and memorials.

The West Point Cemetery is the final resting place of many notable graduates and faculty, including George Armstrong Custer, Winfield Scott, William Westmoreland, Earl Blaik, Margaret Corbin, and eighteen Medal of Honor recipients. The cemetery is also the burial place of several recent graduates who have died during the ongoing conflict in Iraq and Afghanistan. Many of the older grave sites have large and ornate grave markers, the largest belonging to Egbert Viele (class of 1847), chief engineer of Brooklyn's Prospect Park. The cemetery is also home to a monument to Revolutionary War heroine Margaret Corbin.

=== Athletic facilities ===
West Point is home to historic athletic facilities like Michie Stadium and Gillis Field House as well as modern facilities such as the Lichtenberg Tennis Center, Anderson Rugby Complex, and the Lou Gross Gymnastics Facility. Michie Stadium recently underwent a significant upgrade in facilities for the football team, and the academy installed a new artificial turf field in the summer of 2008.

=== West Point Museum ===
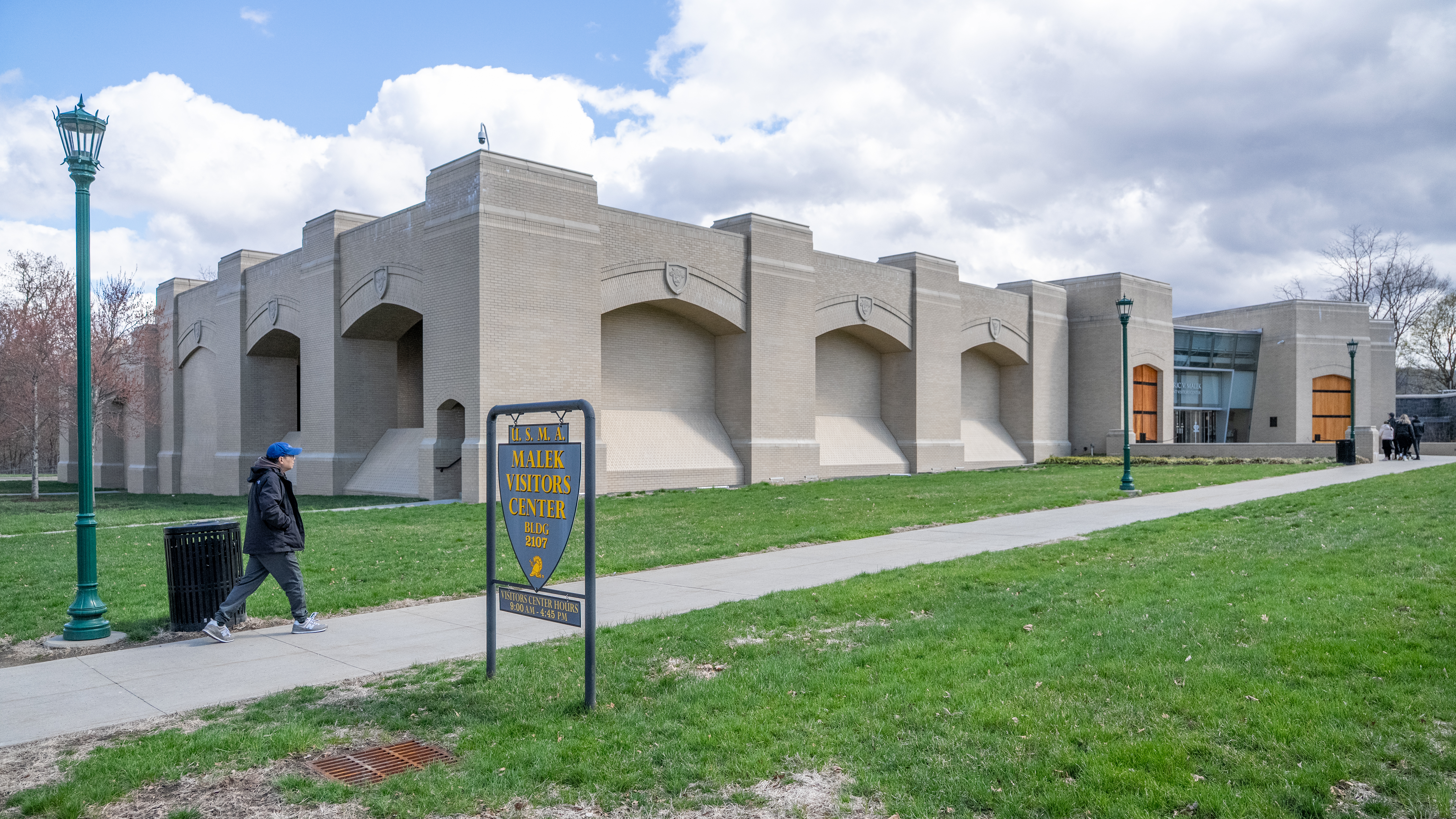
Malek West Point Visitors Center (2026)

The visitor center is just outside the Thayer Gate in the village of Highland Falls and offers the opportunity to arrange for a guided tour. These tours, which are the only way the general public can access the academy grounds, leave the visitor center several times a day. The old West Point Visitor Center was housed in the now-demolished Ladycliff College library building. On 9 September 2016, West Point broke ground in order to begin construction of the new 31,000 square foot Malek West Point Visitors Center. It is being built on the location of the former visitor center. The Malek West Point Visitors Center is named after Frederic Malek, USMA Class of 1959 and a 2014 Distinguished Graduate.

The West Point Museum is directly adjacent to the visitor center, in the renovated Olmsted Hall on the grounds of the former Ladycliff College. Originally opened to the public in 1854, the West Point Museum is the oldest military museum in the country. During the summer months, the museum operates access to the Fort Putnam historic site on main post and access to the 282 acre Constitution Island. Some of the most notable items on display at the museum are George Washington's pistols, Napoleon's sword, a dagger carried by Hermann Göring when he was captured, a revolver that belonged to Göring, and a silver-plated party book, signed by Charles Lindbergh, Herbert Hoover and Mussolini, among others. In addition, a gold-plated Liliput pistol that belonged to Adolf Hitler is on display.

== Administration ==
=== Academy leadership ===
The commanding officer at the USMA is the Superintendent, equivalent to the president or chancellor of a civilian university. In recent years, the position of superintendent has been held by a lieutenant general (three star general). The 62nd Superintendent, Lieutenant General James B. Bartholomees III, took command on 17 August 2026, replacing Steven W. Gilland. The academy is a direct reporting unit, and as such, the Superintendent reports directly to the Army Chief of Staff (CSA).

There are two other general officer positions at the academy. Brigadier General Joseph A. Katz is the Commandant of Cadets, equivalent to a dean of students at the civilian level. Brigadier General Nicholas Gist is the Dean of the Academic Board, equivalent to a provost at the civilian level. Brigadier General Diana Holland was the first female commandant. Brigadier General Jebb was the first female Dean. There are 13 academic departments at USMA, each with a colonel as the head of department. These 13 tenured colonels comprise the core of the Academic Board. These officers are titled "Professors USMA" or PUSMA. The academy is also overseen by the Board of Visitors (BOV). The BOV is a panel of Senators, Congressional Representatives, and presidential appointees who "shall inquire into the morale and discipline, curriculum, instruction, physical equipment, fiscal affairs, academic methods, and other matters relating to the academy that the board decides to consider." Currently the BOV is chaired by Representative John Shimkus and is composed of three Senators, five Representatives and six presidential appointees.

=== Admission requirements ===
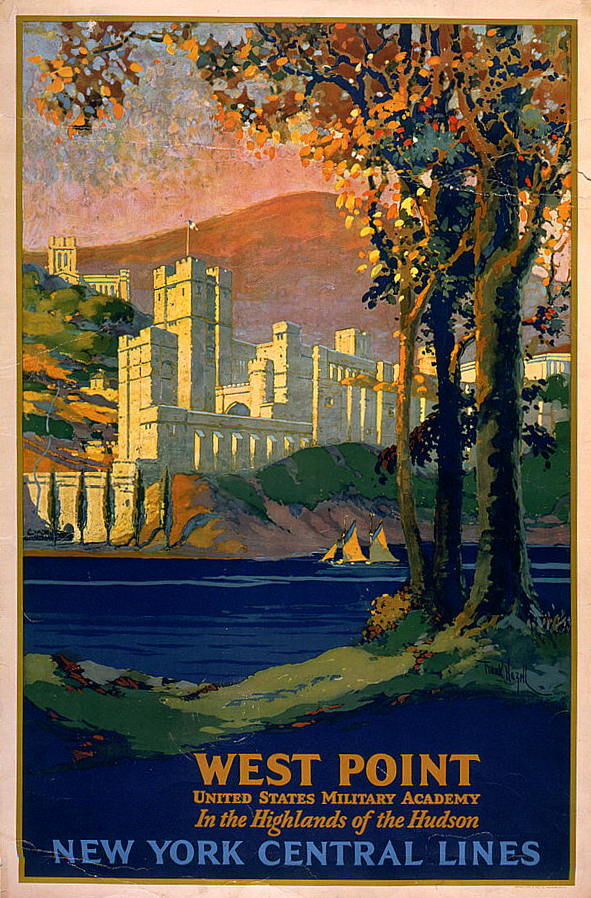
West Point in a New York Central Lines ad

Candidates must be between 17 and 23 years old (waivers have been accepted for 24-year olds in rare cases where the candidate is in the military and deployed and therefore unable to attend before their 24th birthday), unmarried, and with no legal obligation to support a child. Above-average high school or previous college grades and strong performance on standardized testing are expected. The interquartile range on the old SAT was 1100–1360 and 68% ranked in the top fifth of their high school class.

To be eligible for appointment, candidates must also undergo a Candidate Fitness Assessment and a complete physical exam. Up to 60 students from foreign countries are present at USMA, educated at the expense of the sponsoring nation, with tuition assistance based on the GNP of their country. Of these foreign cadets the Code of Federal Regulations specifically permits one Filipino cadet designated by the President of the Philippines.

The actual application process consists of two main requirements: candidates apply to USMA for admission and separately provide a nomination. The majority of candidates receive a nomination from their United States Representative or Senator. Some receive a nomination from the Vice President or even the President of the United States.

The nomination process is not political. The academy applicant typically provides written essays and letters of recommendation. The applicant then submits to a formal interview. Admission to West Point is selective: 7.74% of applicants were admitted (total of 1232) to the Class of 2024.

Candidates may have previous college experience, but they may not transfer, meaning that regardless of previous college credit, they enter the academy as a fourth class cadet and undergo the entire four-year program. Candidates considered academically disqualified and not selected may receive an offer to attend to the United States Military Academy Preparatory School. Upon graduation from USMAPS, these candidates are appointed to the academy if they receive the recommendation of the USMAPS Commandant and meet medical admission requirements.

The West Point Association of Graduates (WPAOG) also offers scholarship support to people who are qualified but not selected. The scholarships usually cover around $7,000 to civilian universities; the students who receive these scholarships do so under the stipulation that they will be admitted to and attend West Point a year later. Those who do not must repay the AOG. Marion Military Institute, New Mexico Military Institute, Georgia Military College, Hargrave Military Academy, Greystone Preparatory School at Schreiner University, and Northwestern Preparatory School are approved programs that students attend on the AOG scholarship prior to admission to West Point.

=== Research centers and institutes ===
The academy's research centers and institutes include:

- Army Cyber Institute
- Combating Terrorism Center
- Center for Data Analysis and Statistics
- Center for Environmental and Geographical Science
- Center for Holocaust and Genocide Studies
- Center for Innovation and Engineering
- Center for Languages, Cultures, and Regional Studies
- Center for Leadership and Diversity in STEM
- Center for Molecular Science
- Center for Oral History
- Center for the Study of Civil-Military Operations
- Cyber Research Center
- Digital History Center
- Lieber Institute for Law & Warfare
- Mathematical Sciences Center
- Modern War Institute
- Operations Research Center
- Photonics Research Center
- Robotics Research Center
- Systems Design and Analysis Center
- West Point Center for the Rule of Law
- West Point Insider Threat Program
- West Point Leadership Center
- West Point Music Research Center
- West Point Simulation Center

== Curriculum ==
West Point is a highly residential baccalaureate college, with a full-time, four-year undergraduate program that emphasizes instruction in the arts, sciences, and professions with no graduate program. There are forty-five academic majors, the most popular of which are foreign languages, management information systems, history, economics, and mechanical engineering. West Point is accredited by the Middle States Commission on Higher Education. Military officers compose 75% of the faculty, while civilian professors make up the remaining 25%.

A cadet's class rank, which determines their Army branch and assignment upon graduation, is calculated as a combination of academic performance (55%), military leadership performance (30%), and physical fitness and athletic performance (15%).

=== Academics ===
The academy's teaching style forms part of the Thayer method, which was implemented by Sylvanus Thayer during his tour as Superintendent. This form of instruction emphasizes small classes with daily homework, and strives to make students actively responsible for their own learning by completing homework assignments prior to class and bringing the work to class to discuss collaboratively.

The academic program consists of a structured core of thirty-one courses balanced between the arts and sciences. The academy operates on the semester system, which it labels as "terms" (Term 1 is the fall semester; Term 2 is the spring semester). Although cadets choose their majors in the spring of their freshmen year, all cadets take the same course of instruction until the beginning of their second year. This core course of instruction consists of mathematics, information technology, chemistry, physics, engineering, history, physical geography, philosophy, leadership and general psychology, English composition and literature, foreign language, political science, international relations, economics, and constitutional law. Some advanced cadets may "validate" out of the base-level classes and take advanced or accelerated courses earlier as freshmen or sophomores. Regardless of major, all cadets graduate with a Bachelor of Science degree.

=== Military ===
As all cadets are commissioned as second lieutenants upon graduation, military and leadership education is nested with academic instruction. Military training and discipline fall under the purview of the Office of the Commandant of Cadets. Entering freshmen, or fourth class cadets, are referred to as New Cadets, and enter the academy on Reception Day or R-day, which marks the start of cadet basic training (CBT), known colloquially as Beast Barracks, or simply Beast. Most cadets consider Beast to be their most difficult time at the academy because of the transition from civilian to military life. Their second summer, cadets undergo cadet field training (CFT) at nearby Camp Buckner, where they train in more advanced field craft and military skills. During a cadet's third summer, they may serve as instructors for CBT or CFT. Rising Firstie (senior) cadets also spend one-month training at Camp Buckner, where they train for modern tactical situations that they will soon face as new platoon leaders. Cadets also have the opportunity during their second, third and fourth summers to serve in active army units and military schools around the world. The schools include Airborne, Air Assault, Sapper, Pathfinder, etc.

Active duty officers in the rank of captain or major serve as Company Tactical Officers (TAC Officers). The role of the TAC is to mentor, train, and teach the cadets proper standards of good order and discipline and be a good role model. There is one TAC for every cadet company. There is also one senior Non-Commissioned Officer to assist each TAC, known as TAC-NCOs.

The Department of Military Instruction (DMI) is responsible for all military arts and sciences education as well as planning and executing the cadet summer training. Within DMI there is a representative from each of the Army's branches. These "branch reps" serve as proponents for their respective branches and liaise with cadets as they prepare for branch selection and graduation. Within DMI sits the Modern War Institute, a research center devoted to the study of contemporary conflict and the evolving character of war.

=== Physical ===
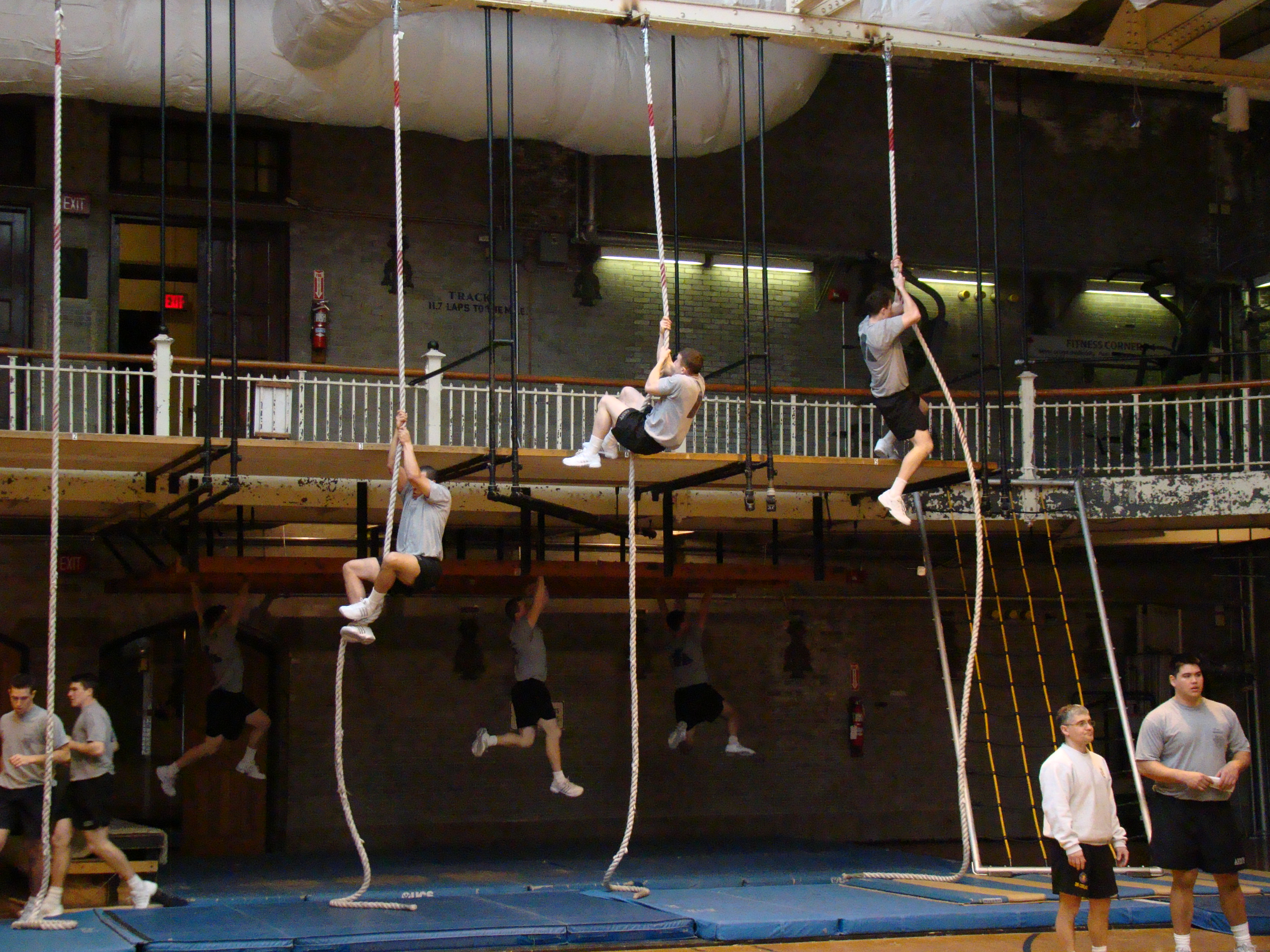
Indoor obstacle course

The Department of Physical Education (DPE) administers the physical program, which includes both physical education classes, physical fitness testing, and competitive athletics. The head of DPE holds the title of Master of the Sword, dating back to the 19th century when DPE taught swordsmanship as part of the curriculum.

All cadets take a prescribed series of physical fitness courses such as military movement (applied gymnastics), boxing, survival swimming, and beginning in 2009, advanced combatives. Cadets can also take elective physical activity classes such as scuba, rock climbing, and aerobic fitness.

As with all soldiers in the Army, cadets also must pass the Army Physical Fitness Test twice per year. Additionally, every year, cadets must pass the Indoor Obstacle Course Test (IOCT), which DPE has administered in Hayes Gymnasium since 1944.

Since Douglas MacArthur's tenure as superintendent, every cadet has been required to participate in either an intercollegiate sport, a club sport, or an intramural (referred to as "company athletics") sport each semester.

=== Moral and ethical training ===
Moral and ethical development occurs throughout the entirety of the cadet experience by living under the honor code and through formal leadership programs available at the academy. These include instruction in the values of the military profession through Professional Military Ethics Education (PME^{2}), voluntary religious programs, interaction with staff and faculty role models, and an extensive guest-speaker program. The foundation of the ethical code at West Point is found in the academy's motto, "Duty, Honor, Country."

West Point's Cadet Honor Code reads simply that: "A cadet will not lie, cheat, steal, or tolerate those who do." Cadets accused of violating the Honor Code face an investigative and hearing process. If they are found guilty by a jury of their peers, they face severe consequences ranging from being "turned back" (repeating an academic year) to separation from the academy. Cadets previously enforced collective censure by an unofficial sanction known as "silencing" by not speaking to cadets accused of violating the honor code, but the practice ended in 1973 after national scrutiny.

Although the academy's honor code is well known and has been influential for many other colleges and universities, the academy has experienced several significant violations. For example, 151 junior cadets were found guilty of "violating the honor code" in their exams in 1976. In 2020, more than 70 cadets were also accused of cheating on exams.

== Cadet life ==
=== Rank and organization ===
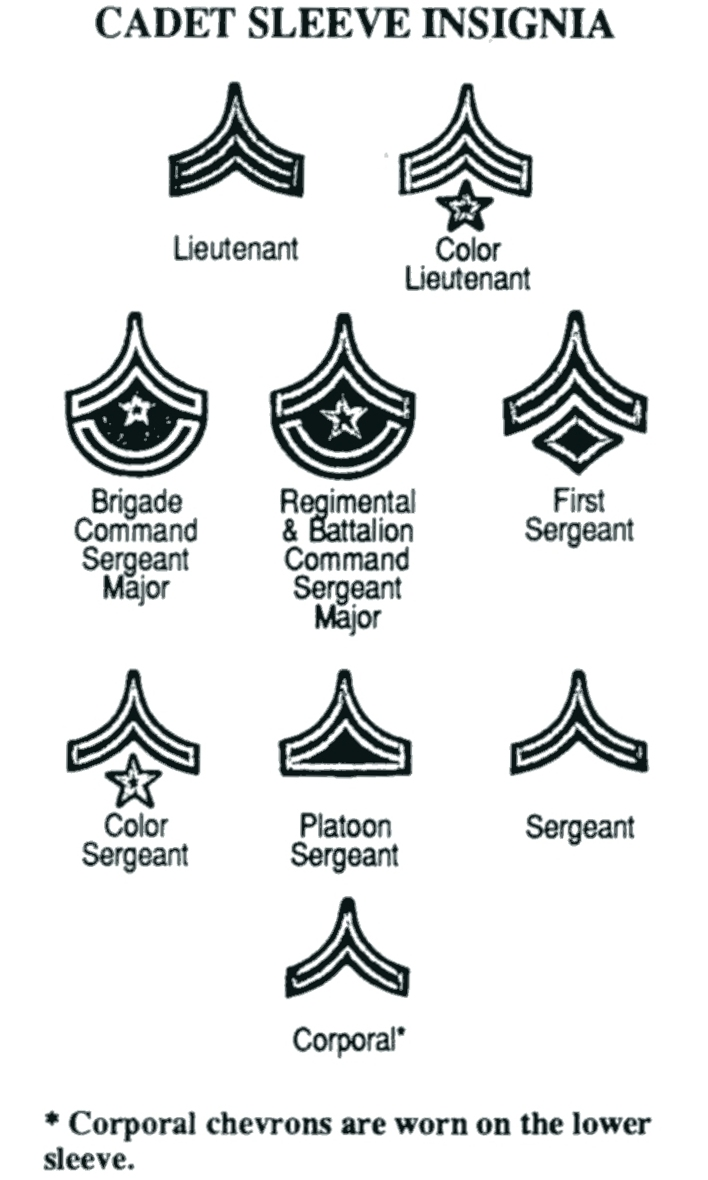
Cadet shoulder sleeve insignia

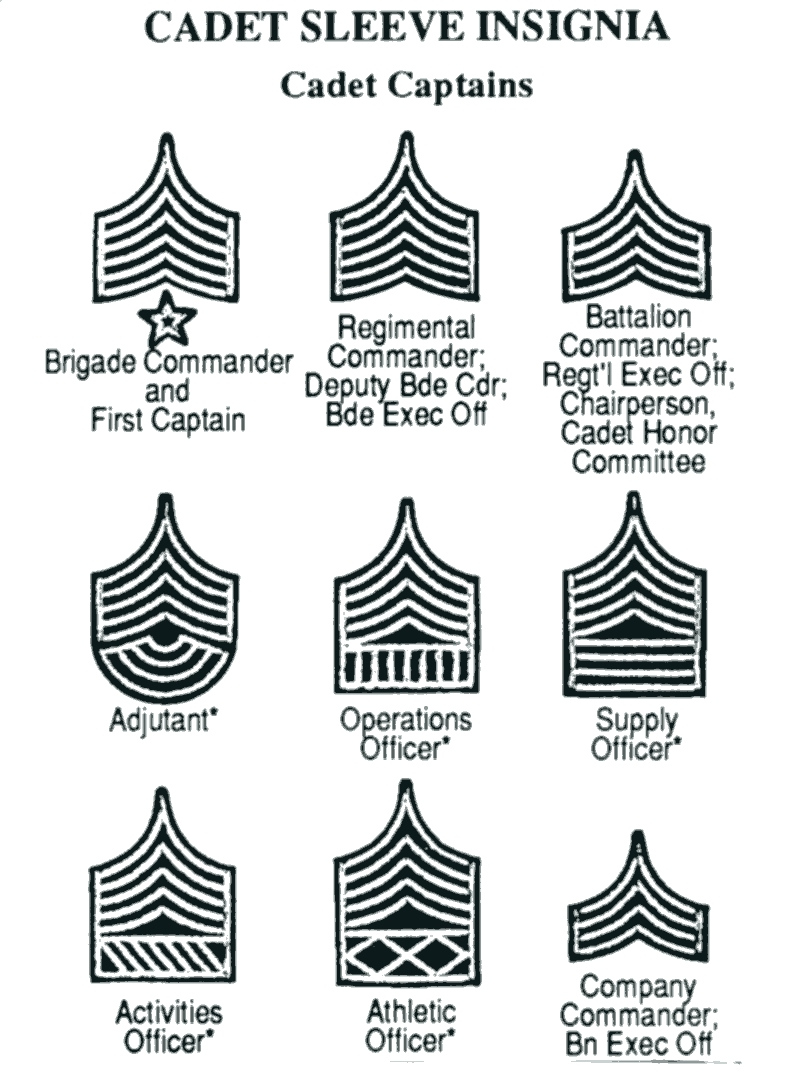
Cadet captains' shoulder sleeve insignia

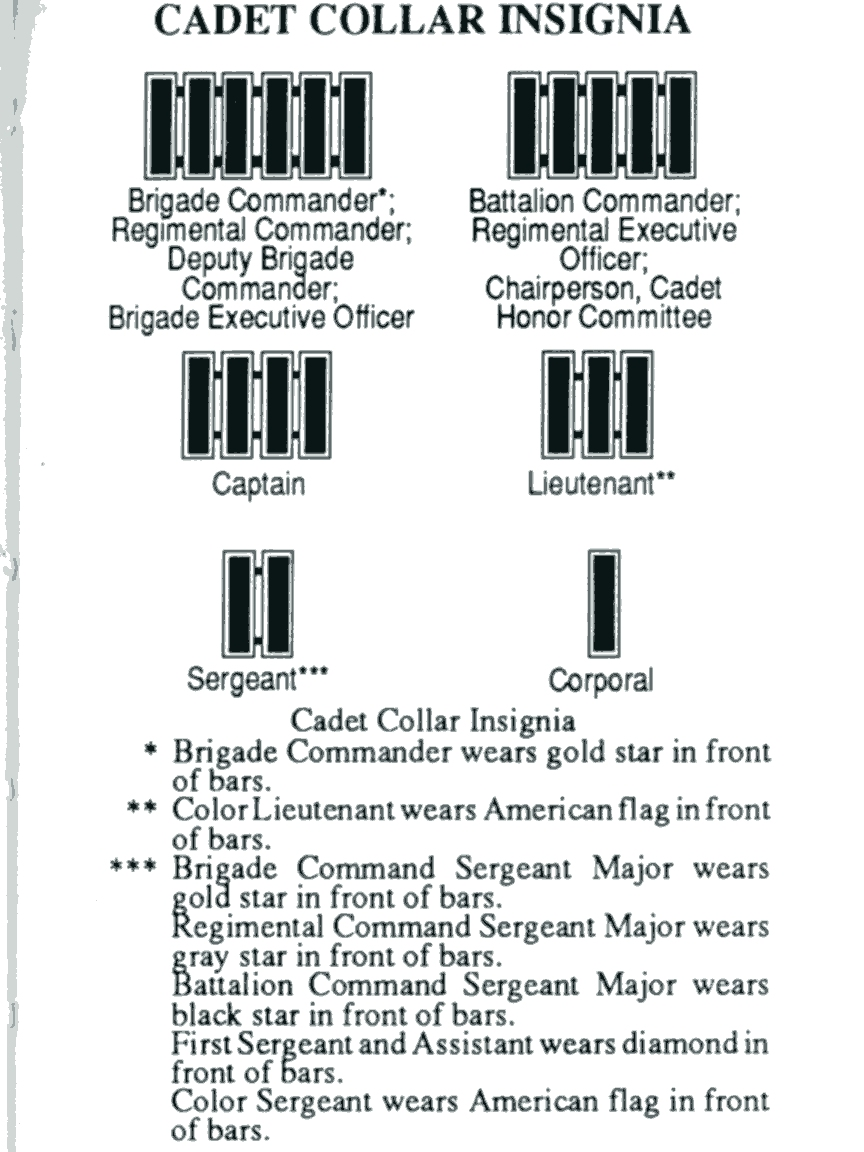
Cadet collar insignia

Cadets are not referred to as freshmen, sophomores, juniors, or seniors. Instead, they are officially called fourth class, third class, second class, and first class cadets. Colloquially, freshmen are plebes, sophomores are yearlings or yuks, juniors are cows, and seniors are firsties. Only some of the origins of the class names are known. Plebeians were the lower class of ancient Roman society, while yearling is a euphemism for a year-old animal. There are a number of theories for the origin of the term cow; however the most prevalent and probably accurate one is that cadets had no leave until the end of their yearling year, when they were granted a summer-long furlough. Their return as second classmen was heralded as "the cows coming home."

The Corps of Cadets is officially organized into a brigade. The senior ranking cadet, the Brigade Commander, is known traditionally as the First Captain. The brigade is organized into four regiments. Within each regiment there are three battalions, each consisting of three companies. Companies are lettered A through I, with a number signifying which regiment it belongs to. For example, there are four "H" companies: H1, H2, H3, and H4. First class cadets hold the leadership positions within the brigade from the First Captain down to platoon leaders within the companies. Leadership responsibility decreases with the lower classes, with second class cadets holding the rank of cadet sergeant, third class cadets holding the rank of cadet corporal, and fourth class cadets as cadet privates.

=== Life in the corps ===
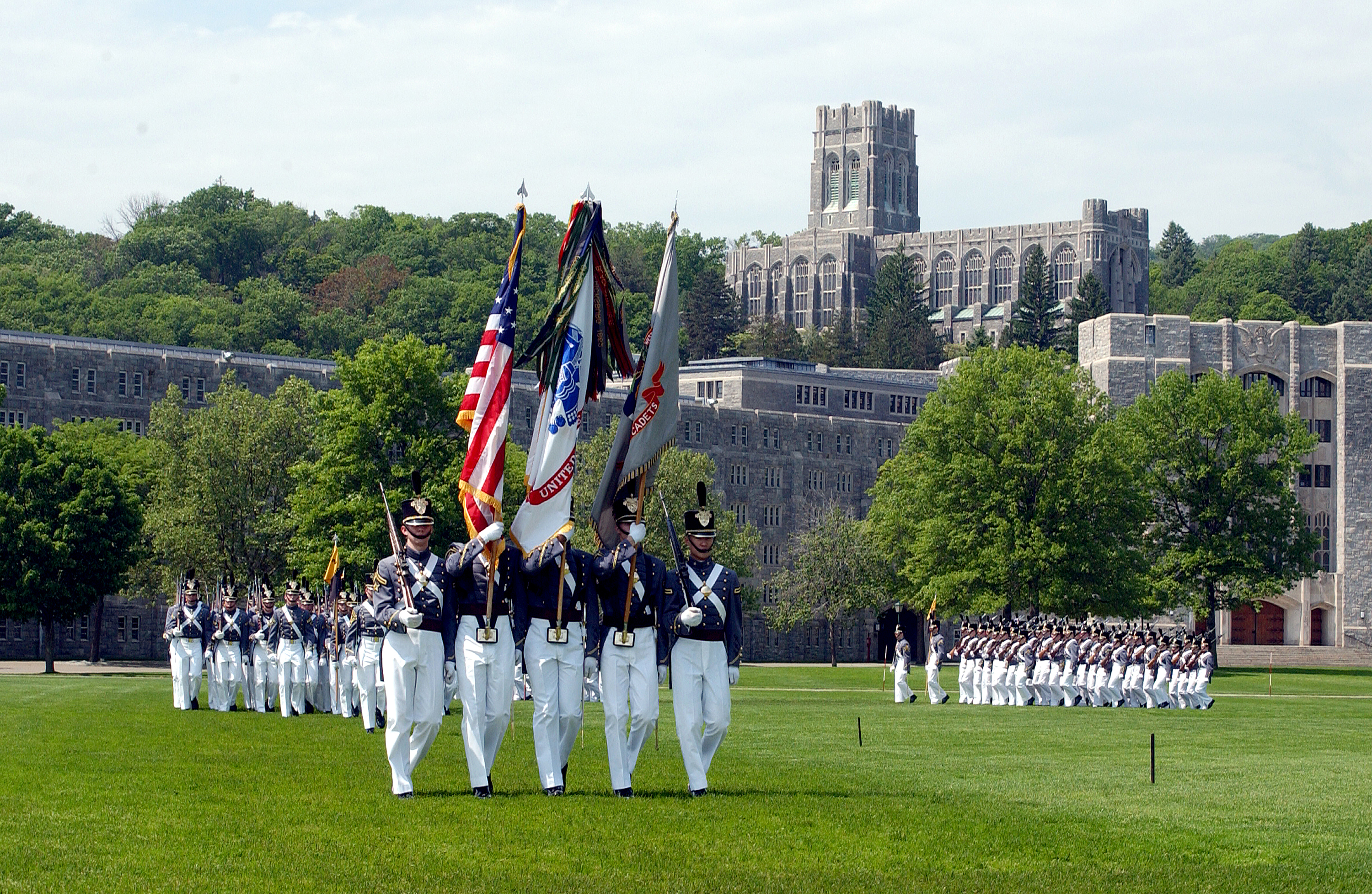
Cadet color guard on parade

Because of the academy's congressional nomination process, students come from all 50 states, Puerto Rico, the District of Columbia, the Mariana Islands, Guam, American Samoa, and the US Virgin Islands. The academy is also authorized up to 60 international exchange cadets, who undergo the same four-year curriculum as fully integrated members of the Corps of Cadets. Cadets attend the United States Military Academy free of charge, with all tuition and board paid for by the Army in return for a service commitment of five years of active duty and three years of reserve status upon graduation.

Most graduates are commissioned as second lieutenants in the Army. Foreign cadets are commissioned into the armies of their home countries. Since 1959, cadets have also had the option of "cross-commissioning," or requesting a commission in one of the other armed services, provided they meet that service's eligibility standards. Every year, a small number of graduates do this, usually in a one-for-one "trade" with a similarly inclined cadet or midshipman at one of the other service academies.

Starting on the first day of a cadet's second class year, non-graduates after that point are expected to fulfill their obligations in enlisted service. Cadets receive a monthly stipend of $1,017.00 for books, uniforms, and other necessities, as of 2015. From this amount, pay is automatically deducted for the cost of uniforms, books, supplies, services, meals, and other miscellaneous expenses. All remaining money after deductions is used at the individual cadets' discretion. All cadets receive meals in the dining halls and have access to internet on approved, issued devices. The student population was 4,389 cadets for the 2016–2017 academic year. The student body has recently been around 20% female.

Student body composition as of 2 May 2022
Race and ethnicity	Total
White	62%
Black	13%
Hispanic	12%
Asian	8%
Other (Note: Other consists of Multiracial Americans & those who prefer to not say.)	4%
Foreign national	1%
Native American	1%
Economic diversity
Data not available

All cadets reside on campus for their entire four years in one of the nine barracks buildings. Most cadets are housed with one roommate, but some rooms are designed for three cadets. Cadets are grouped into companies identified by alpha-numeric codes. All companies live together in the same barracks area. The commandant may decide to have cadets change companies at some point in their cadet career. This process is known as scrambling and the method of scrambling has changed several times in recent years. All 4,000 cadets dine together at breakfast and lunch in the Washington Hall during the weekdays. The cadet fitness center, Arvin Cadet Physical Development Center (usually just called "Arvin" by cadets and faculty), which was rebuilt in 2004, houses extensive physical fitness facilities and equipment for student use.

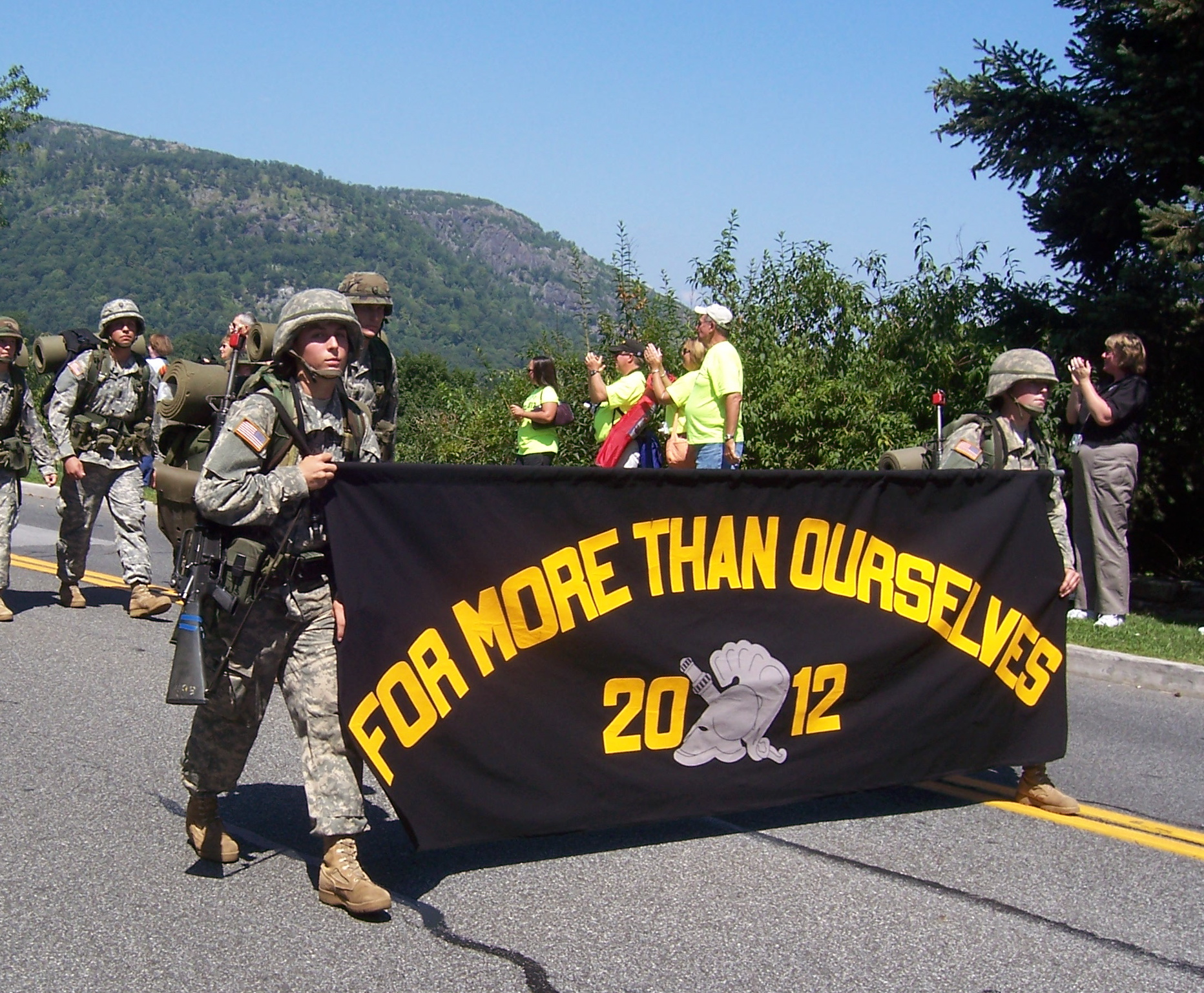
Class of 2012's motto

Each class of cadets elects representatives to serve as class president and fill several administrative positions. They also elect a ring and crest committee, which designs the class's crest, the emblem that signifies their class and is embossed upon their class rings. Each class crest is required to contain the initials USMA and their class motto. The class motto is proposed by the class during cadet basic training and voted on by the class prior to the beginning of their freshman academic year. Class mottos typically have wording that rhymes or is phonetically similar to their class year.

Cadets today live and work within the framework of the West Point Leader Development System (WPLDS), which specifies the roles that a cadet plays throughout their four years at the academy. Cadets begin their USMA careers as trainees (new cadets), then advance in rank, starting as CDT Privates (freshmen) and culminating as CDT Officers (seniors). Freshmen have no leadership responsibilities, but have a host of duties to perform as they learn how to follow orders and operate in an environment of rigid rank structure, while seniors have significant leadership responsibilities and significantly more privileges that correspond to their rank.

=== Activities ===
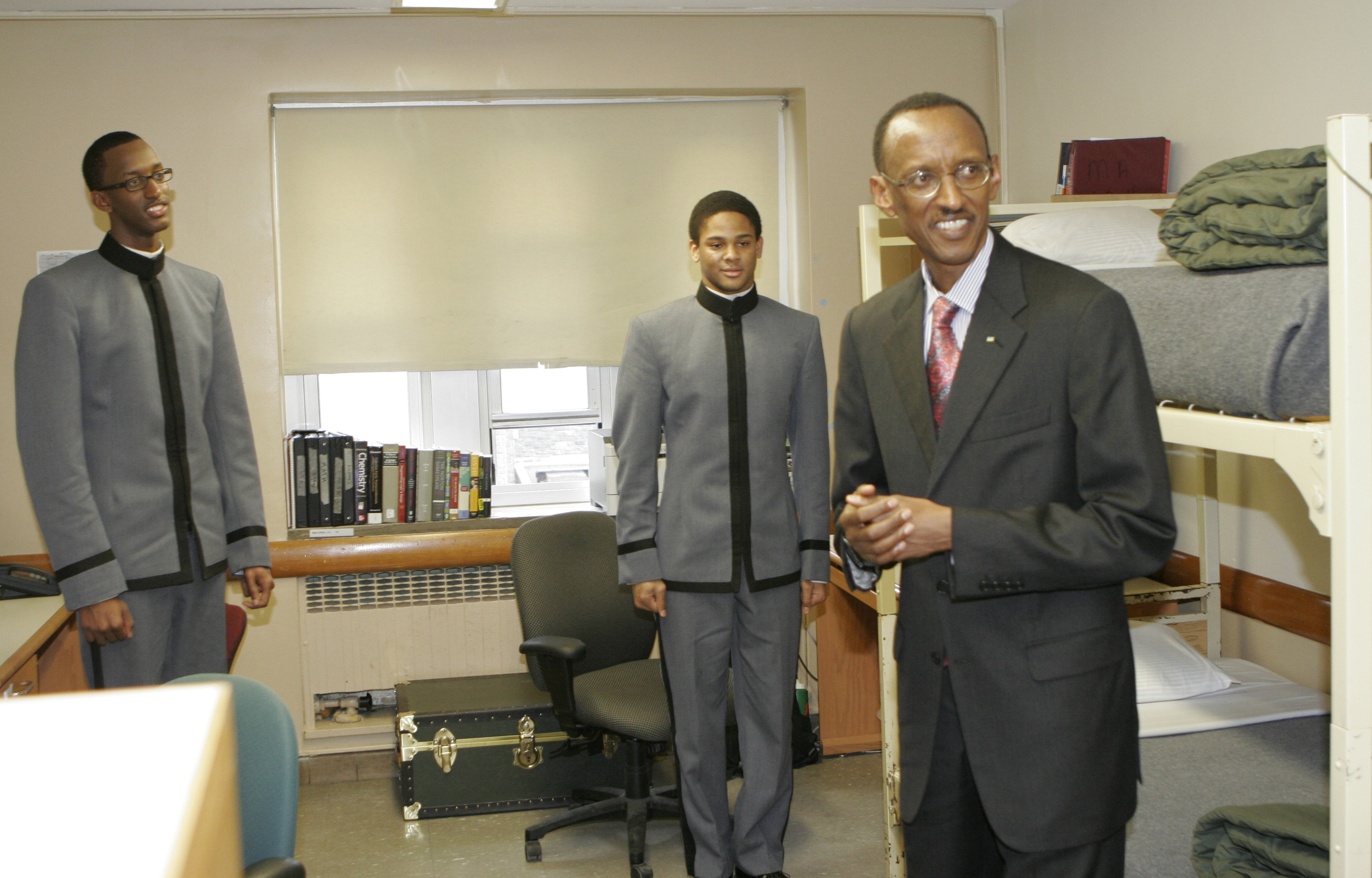
Rwandan President Paul Kagame visits his son's room during Plebe-Parent Weekend

Cadets have a host of extracurricular activities available, most run by the office of the Directorate of Cadet Activities (DCA). DCA sponsors or operates 113 athletic and non-sport clubs. Many cadets join several clubs during their time at the academy and find their time spent with their clubs a welcome respite from the rigors of cadet life. DCA is responsible for a wide range of activities that provide improved quality of life for cadets, including: three cadet-oriented restaurants, the Cadet Store, and the Howitzer and Bugle Notes. The Howitzer is the annual yearbook, while Bugle Notes, also known as the "plebe bible," is the manual of plebe knowledge. Plebe knowledge is a lengthy collection of traditions, songs, poems, anecdotes, and facts about the academy, the army, the Old Corps, and the rivalry with Navy that all plebes must memorize during cadet basic training. During plebe year, plebes may be asked, and are expected to answer, any inquiry about plebe knowledge asked by upper class cadets. Other knowledge is historical in nature, including information as found in Bugle Notes. However, some knowledge changes daily, such as "the days" (a running list of the number of days until important academy events), the menu in the mess hall for the day, or the lead stories in The New York Times.

Each cadet class celebrates at least one special "class weekend" per academic year. Fourth class cadets participate in Plebe Parent Weekend during the first weekend of spring break. In February, third class cadets celebrate the winter season with Yearling Winter Weekend. In late January the second class cadets celebrate 500th Night, marking the remaining 500 days before graduation. First class cadets celebrate three different formal occasions. In late August, first class cadets celebrate Ring Weekend, in February they mark their last 100 days with 100th Night, and in May they have a full week of events culminating in their graduation. All of the "class weekends" involve a formal dinner and social dance, known in old cadet slang as a "hop," held at Eisenhower Hall. Grant Hall, formerly the cadet mess hall at West Point, is now a social center. Cadets also have an array of extracurricular options beyond the school's grounds, including in the Peace & Dialogue Leadership Initiative and the academy's Foreign Academy Exchange Program.

== Athletics ==
Since 1899, Army's mascot has officially been a mule because the animal symbolizes strength and perseverance. The academy's football team was nicknamed "The Black Knights of the Hudson" due to the black color of its uniforms. This nickname has since been officially shortened to the "Black Knights." U.S. sports media use "Army" as a synonym for the academy. "On Brave Old Army Team" is the school's fight song. Army's chief sports rival is the Naval Academy due to its long-standing football rivalry and the interservice rivalry with the Navy in general. Fourth class cadets verbally greet upper-class cadets and faculty with "Beat Navy," while the tunnel that runs under Washington Road is named the "Beat Navy" tunnel. Army also plays the U.S. Air Force Academy for the Commander-in-Chief's Trophy. In the first half of the 20th century, Army and Notre Dame were football rivals, but that rivalry has since died out. Notre Dame beat Army 44 – 6 in 2016.

=== Football ===
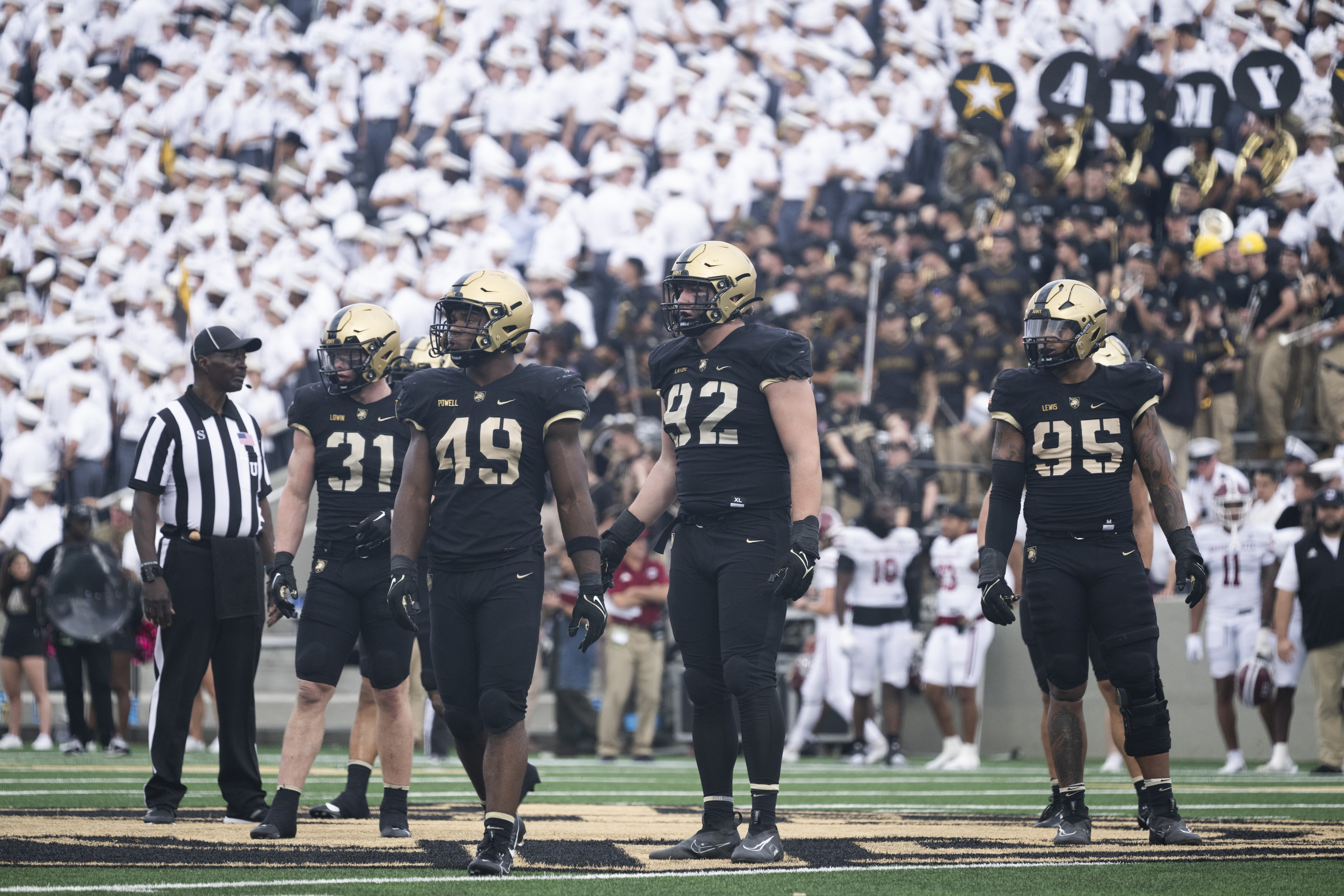
Army football players during a game at Michie Stadium in 2023

Army football began in 1890, when Navy challenged the cadets to a game of the relatively new sport. Navy defeated Army at West Point that year, but Army avenged the loss in Annapolis the following year. The rival academies still clash every December in what is traditionally the last regular-season Division I college-football game. The 2015 football season marked Navy's fourteenth consecutive victory over Army, the longest streak in the series since inception. The following year, Army won 21–17. Army's football team reached its pinnacle of success under coach Earl Blaik when Army won consecutive national championships in 1944, 1945 and 1946, and produced three Heisman Trophy winners: Doc Blanchard (1945), Glenn Davis (1946) and Pete Dawkins (1958). Past NFL coaches Vince Lombardi and Bill Parcells were Army assistant coaches early in their careers. The football team plays its home games at Michie Stadium, where the playing field is named after Earl Blaik. Cadets' attendance is mandatory at football games and the Corps stands for the duration of the game. At all home games, one of the four regiments marches onto the field in formation before the team takes the field and leads the crowd in traditional Army cheers. From 1992 through 1996, Army won all of the games against Navy for the first time since the legendary days of Blanchard and Davis, and it introduced the fraternal group of players identifying themselves as the Fat Man Club, initiated by the offensive linemen of the Class of 1996. Between the 1998 and 2004 seasons, Army's football program was a member of Conference USA, but has since joined the American Athletic Conference.

=== Other sports ===
Though football may receive a lot of media attention due to its annual rivalry game, West Point has a long history of athletics in other NCAA sports. Army is a member of the Division I Patriot League in most sports, while its men's ice hockey program competes in Atlantic Hockey. John P. Riley Jr. was the hockey coach at West Point for more than 35 years. Every year, Army faces the Royal Military College of Canada (RMC) Paladins in the annual West Point Weekend hockey game. This series was first conceived in 1923.

The men's lacrosse team has won eight national championships and appeared in the NCAA tournament sixteen times. In its early years, lacrosse was used by football players, like the "Lonesome End" Bill Carpenter, to stay in shape during the off-season. The 2005–06 women's basketball team went 20–11 and won the Patriot League tournament. They went to the 2006 NCAA Women's Division I Basketball Tournament as a 15th-ranked seed, where they lost to Tennessee, 102–54. It was the first March Madness tournament appearance for any Army basketball team. The head coach of that team, Maggie Dixon, died soon after the season at only 28 years of age. Bob Knight, formerly the winningest men's basketball coach in NCAA history, began his head coaching career at Army in the late 1960s before moving on to Indiana and Texas Tech. One of Knight's players at Army was Mike Krzyzewski, who later was head coach at Army before moving on to Duke, where he has won five national championships.

Approximately 15% of cadets are members of a club sport team. West Point fields a total of 24 club sports teams that have been very successful in recent years, winning national championships in judo, boxing, orienteering, pistol, triathlon, crew, cycling, and team handball.

The majority of the student body, about 65%, competes in intramural sports, known at the academy as "company athletics." DPE's Competitive Sports committee runs the club and company athletics sports programs and was recently named one of the "15 Most Influential Sports Education Teams in America" by the Institute for International Sport. The fall season sees competition in basketball, flag-football, team handball, soccer, ultimate disc, and wrestling; while the spring season sees competition in combative grappling, floor hockey, orienteering, flicker ball, and swimming. In the spring, each company also fields a team entry into the annual Sandhurst Competition, a military skills event conducted by the Department of Military Instruction.

== Traditions ==
The Corps
Bishop H.S. Shipman's "The Corps" is considered the second most important song at the United States Military Academy behind the Alma Mater.

Due to West Point's age and its unique mission of producing Army officers, it has many time-honored traditions. The list below are some of the traditions unique to or started by the academy.

=== Cullum number ===
The Cullum number is a reference and identification number assigned to each graduate. It was created by brevet Major General George W. Cullum (USMA Class of 1833) who, in 1850, began the monumental work of chronicling the biographies of every graduate. He assigned number one to the first West Point graduate, Joseph Gardner Swift, and then numbered all successive graduates in sequence. Before his death in 1892, General Cullum completed the first three volumes of a work that eventually comprised 10 volumes, titled General Cullum's Biographical Register of the Officers and Graduates of the United States Military Academy, and covering USMA classes from 1802 through 1850. From 1802 through the Class of 1977, graduates were listed by General Order of Merit. Beginning with the Class of 1978, graduates were listed alphabetically within each class. Ten graduates have an "A" suffix after their Cullum Number. For various reasons these graduates were omitted from the original class rosters, and a suffix letter was added to avoid renumbering the entire class and subsequent classes. Former cadets, those who attended but did not graduate but separated under honorable conditions, are also given Cullum numbers in a different configuration.

=== Class ring ===
West Point began the collegiate tradition of the class ring, beginning with the class of 1835. The class of 1836 chose no rings, and the class of 1879 had cuff links in lieu of a class ring. Before 1917, cadets could design much of the ring individually, but now only the center stone can be individualized. One side of the ring bears the academy crest, while the other side bears the class crest and the center stone ring bears the words West Point and the class year. The academy library has a large collection of cadet rings on display. Senior cadets receive their rings during Ring Weekend in the early fall of their senior year. Immediately after senior cadets return to the barracks after receiving their rings, fourth class cadets take the opportunity to surround senior cadets from their company and ask to touch their rings. After the cadets recite a poem known as the Ring Poop, the senior usually grants the freshmen permission to touch the ring. In 2002, the Memorial Class ring donor program began. Donations of class rings are melted and merged. A portion of the original gold is infused with gold from preceding melts to become part of the rings for each 'Firstie' class.

=== Thayer Award ===
West Point is home to the Sylvanus Thayer Award. Given annually by the academy since 1958, the award honors an outstanding citizen whose service and accomplishments in the national interest exemplify the academy's motto, "Duty, Honor, Country." Currently, the award guidelines state that the recipient not be a graduate of the academy. The award has been awarded to many notable American citizens, to include Barack Obama, George H. W. Bush, Colin Powell, Tom Brokaw, Sandra Day O'Connor, Henry Kissinger, Ronald Reagan, Barry Goldwater, Carl Vinson, Barbara Jordan, William J. Perry, Bob Hope, Condoleezza Rice and Leon E. Panetta.

=== Sedgwick's spurs ===
Sedgwick's spurs

A monument to Civil War Union General John Sedgwick stands on the outskirts of the Plain. Sedgwick's bronze statue has spurs with rowels that freely rotate. Legend states that if a cadet is in danger of failing a class, they are to don their full-dress parade uniform the night before the final exam. The cadet visits the statue and spins the rowels at the stroke of midnight. Then the cadet runs back to the barracks as fast as possible. According to legend, if Sedgwick's ghost catches them, they will fail the exam. Otherwise, the cadet will pass the exam and the course. Although being out of their rooms after midnight is officially against regulations, violations have been known to be overlooked for the sake of tradition.

=== Goat-Engineer game ===
As part of the run-up to the Navy football game, the Corps of Cadets plays the Goat-Engineer game. First played in 1907, it is a game between the "Goats" (the bottom half of the senior (Firstie) class academically), and the "Engineers" (the top half). The game is played with full pads and helmets using eight-man football rules. The location has changed over the years, with recent venues being Richard Shea Stadium/Doubleday Field, Michie Stadium, and Daly Field. Legend states that Army will beat Navy if the goats win, and the opposite if the engineers win. In recent years, female cadets have begun playing a flag football contest, so there are now two Goat-Engineer games, played consecutively the same night.

=== Walking the area ===
From the earliest days of the academy, one form of punishment for cadets who commit regulatory infractions has been a process officially known as punishment tours. This process is better known to the cadets as "hours" because as punishment, cadets must walk a specified number of hours in penalty. Cadets are "awarded" punishment tours based upon the severity of the infraction. Being late to class or having an unkempt room may result in as little as 2 hours while more severe misconduct infractions may result in upwards of 60 to 80 hours. In its most traditional form, punishment tours are "walked off" by wearing the dress gray uniform under arms and walking back and forth in a designated area of the cadet barracks courtyard, known as "Central Area." Cadets who get into trouble frequently and spend many weekends "walking off their hours" are known as "area birds." Cadets who walk more than 100 total hours in their career are affectionately known as "Century Men." An alternate form of punishment to walking hours is known as "fatigue tours," where assigned hours may be "worked off" by manual labor, such as cleaning the barracks. Certain cadets whose academics are deficient may also conduct "sitting tours," where they have to "sit hours" in a designated academic room in a controlled study environment, for which they receive half credit towards their reduction of tours. Cadets' uniforms are inspected before their tours begin each day. The inspection process is arduous and considered part of the punishment, but the time spent does not count against the awarded number of tours. A small number of cadets may be relieved of their tours that day if their uniforms are exceptionally presentable. Another tradition associated with punishment tours is that any visiting head of state has the authority to grant "amnesty," releasing all cadets with outstanding hours from the remainder of their assigned tours.

=== Sandhurst Military Skills Competition ===
In 1967 the Royal Military Academy Sandhurst presented West Point with a British Army officer's sword for use as a trophy in a military skills competition at West Point. In 2019 the Sandhurst competition spans two days, 12 and 13 April, with teams from USMA, the ROTC programs, the Naval, Coast Guard, and the Air Force academies. International academies including the UK, Canada, Australia and Ireland have won the Sandhurst Military Skills Competition.

== Education of dependents ==
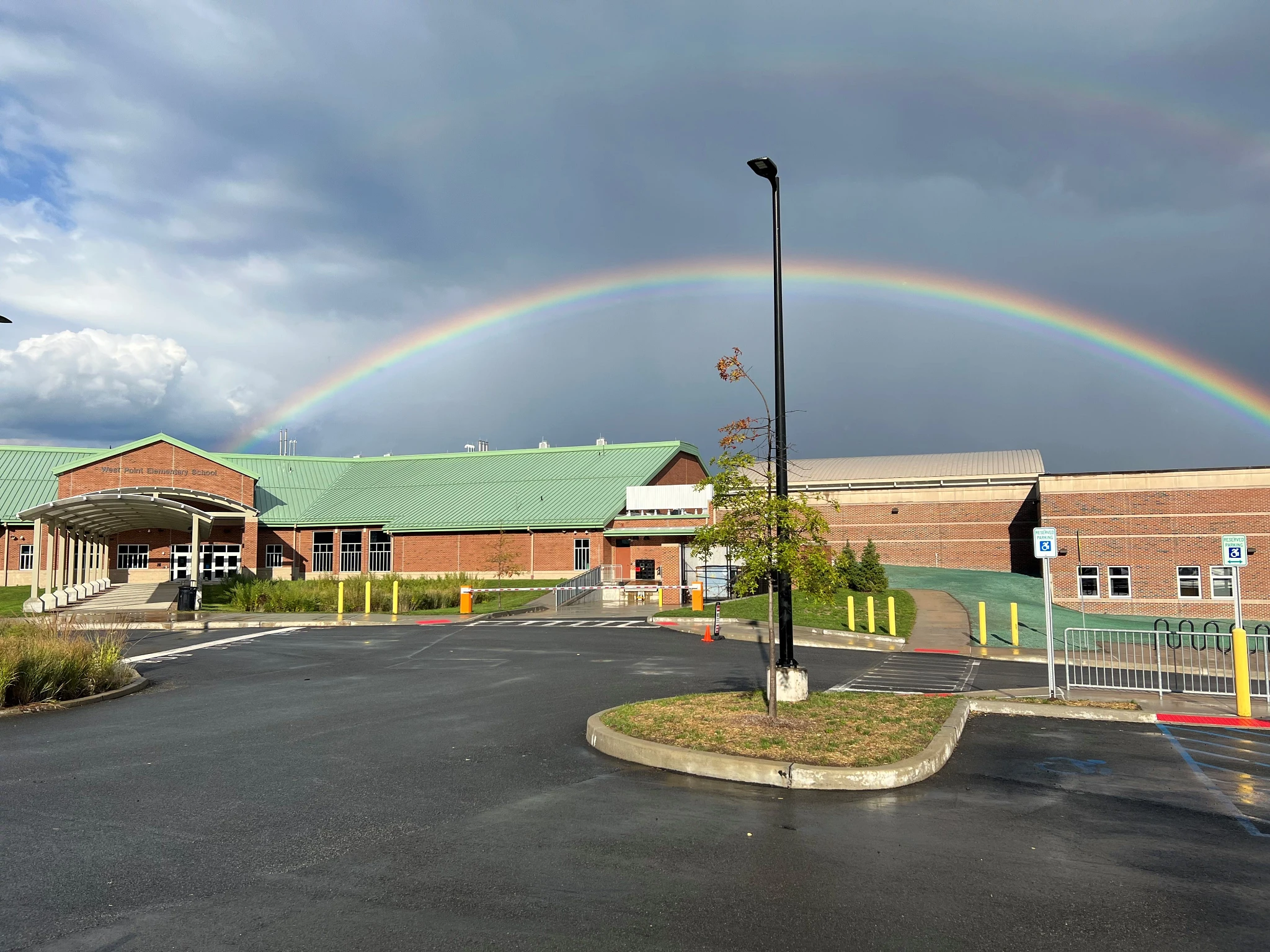
West Point Elementary School

The Department of Defense Education Activity (DoDEA) maintains, for children of military personnel, West Point Elementary School and West Point Middle School on the academy grounds.

The academy is physically in the Highland Falls Central School District. USMA sends high school aged students who are dependents of on-base military personnel to James I. O'Neill High School of Highland Falls schools under contract. In 2021, 190 children living on West Point attended O'Neill. In 2021 the agency at West Point announced that the bid to educate West Point High School students would be competitive. In March 2022 the O'Neill contract was renewed.

== Ranking ==
The U.S. Military Academy at West Point is considered a liberal arts college by U.S. News and it is ranked #8 in the 2025 edition of Best Colleges in National Liberal Arts Colleges.

== Preparatory school ==
The U.S. Military Academy Preparatory School, known as USMAPS, the Prep School, or West Point Prep, was formally established in 1946, but the history of "prepping" soldiers for West Point has been done since Congress enacted legislation in 1916 authorizing soldier appointments to West Point. The school exists today to prepare soldiers and civilians with the academic, leadership, and physical skills to become successful cadets at the United States Military Academy. It is primarily an academic institution that accepts students and soldiers.

== Notable alumni ==
Notable alumni include:

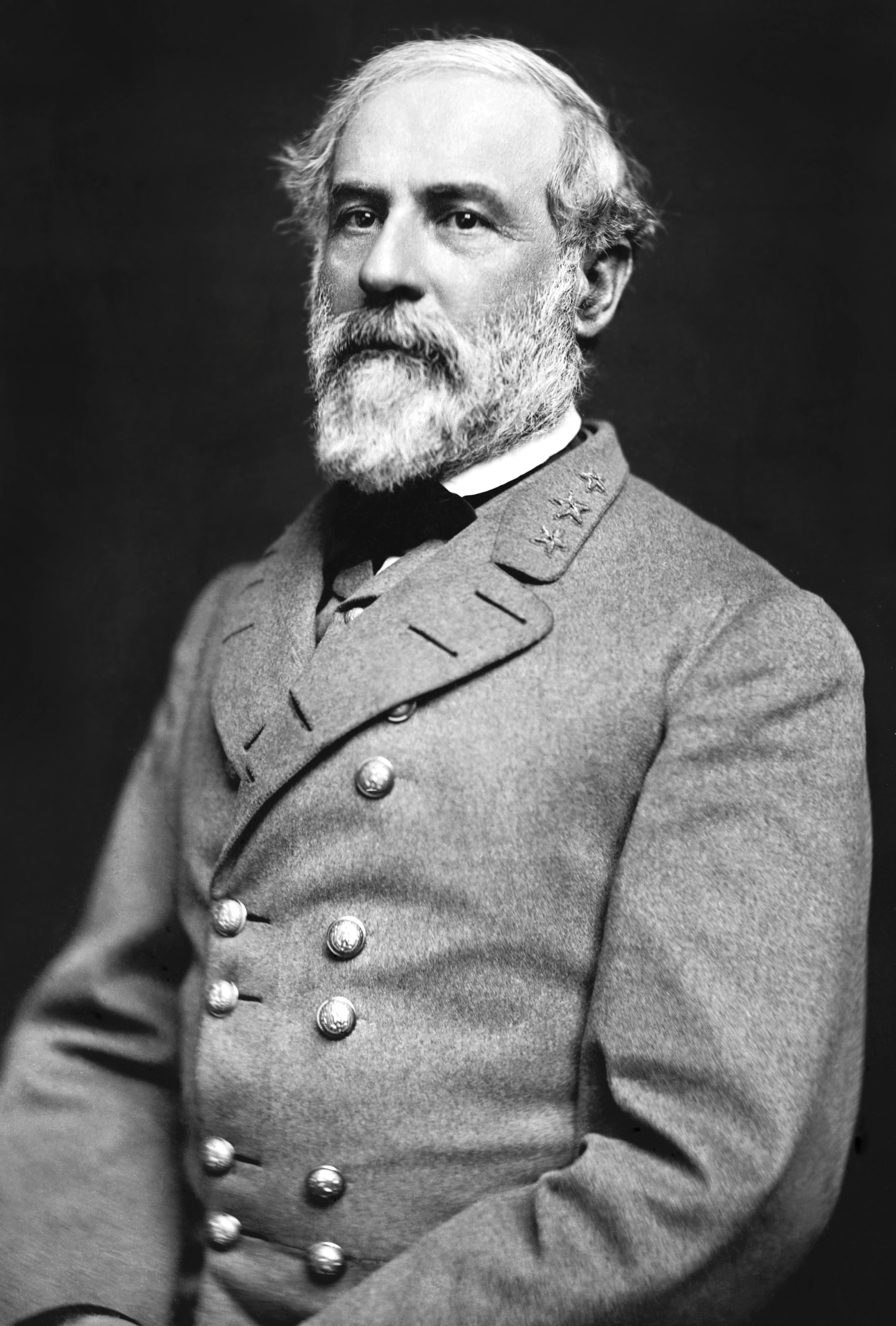
Robert E. Lee: Confederate general (1829)

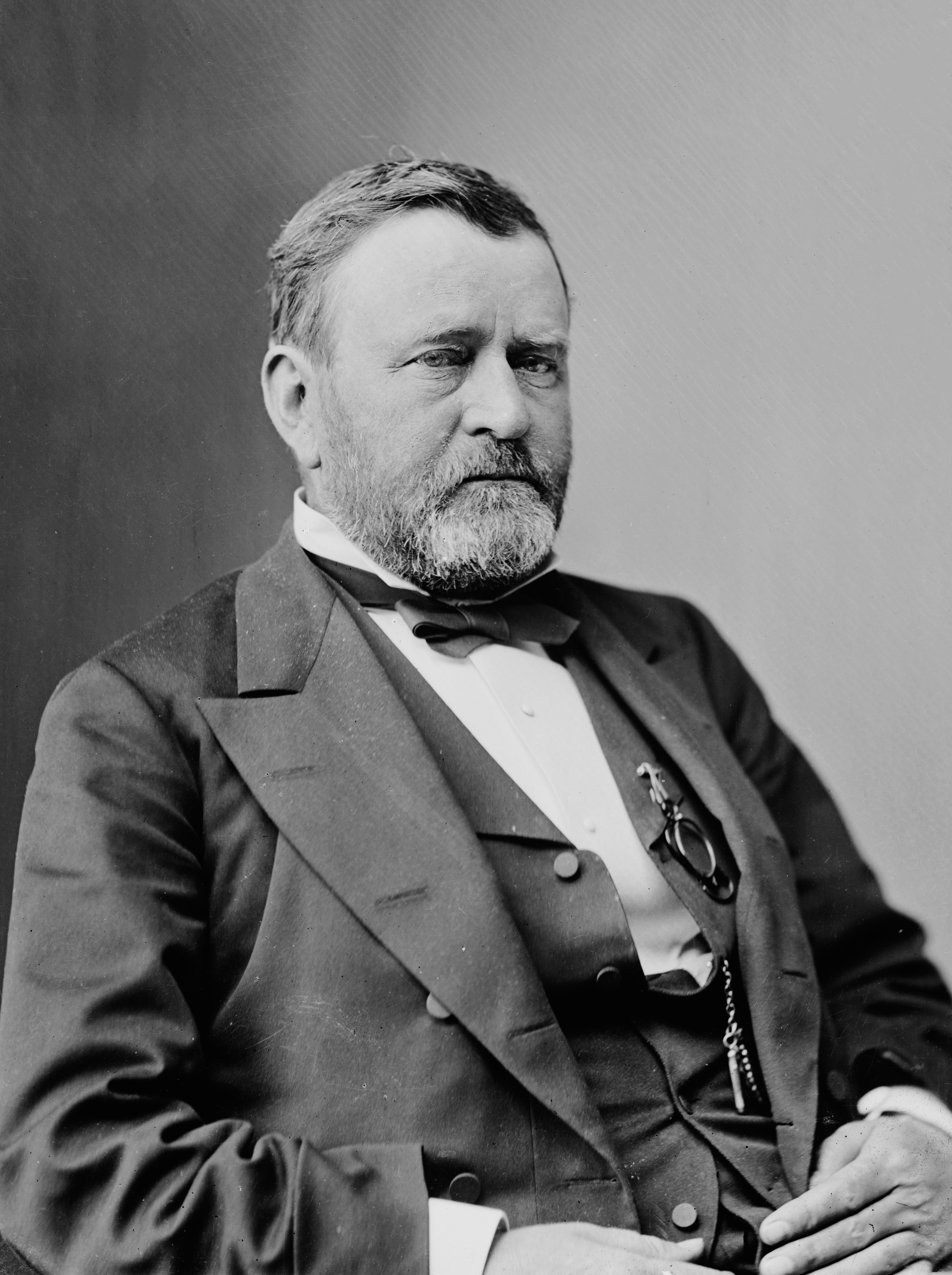
Ulysses S. Grant: 18th President of the United States (1843)

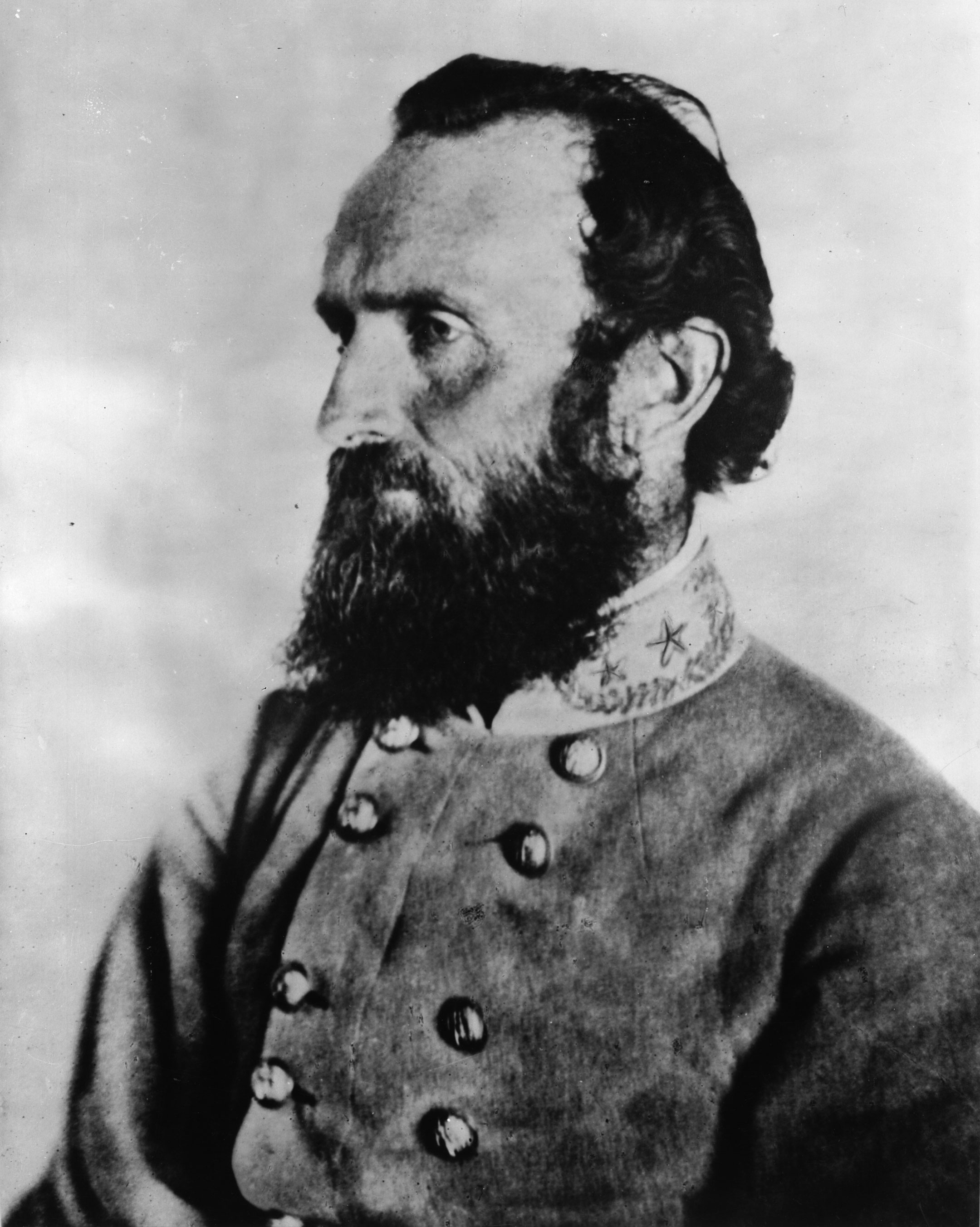
Stonewall Jackson: Confederate general during the Civil War (1846)

William Tecumseh Sherman: former Commanding General of the United States Army (1849)

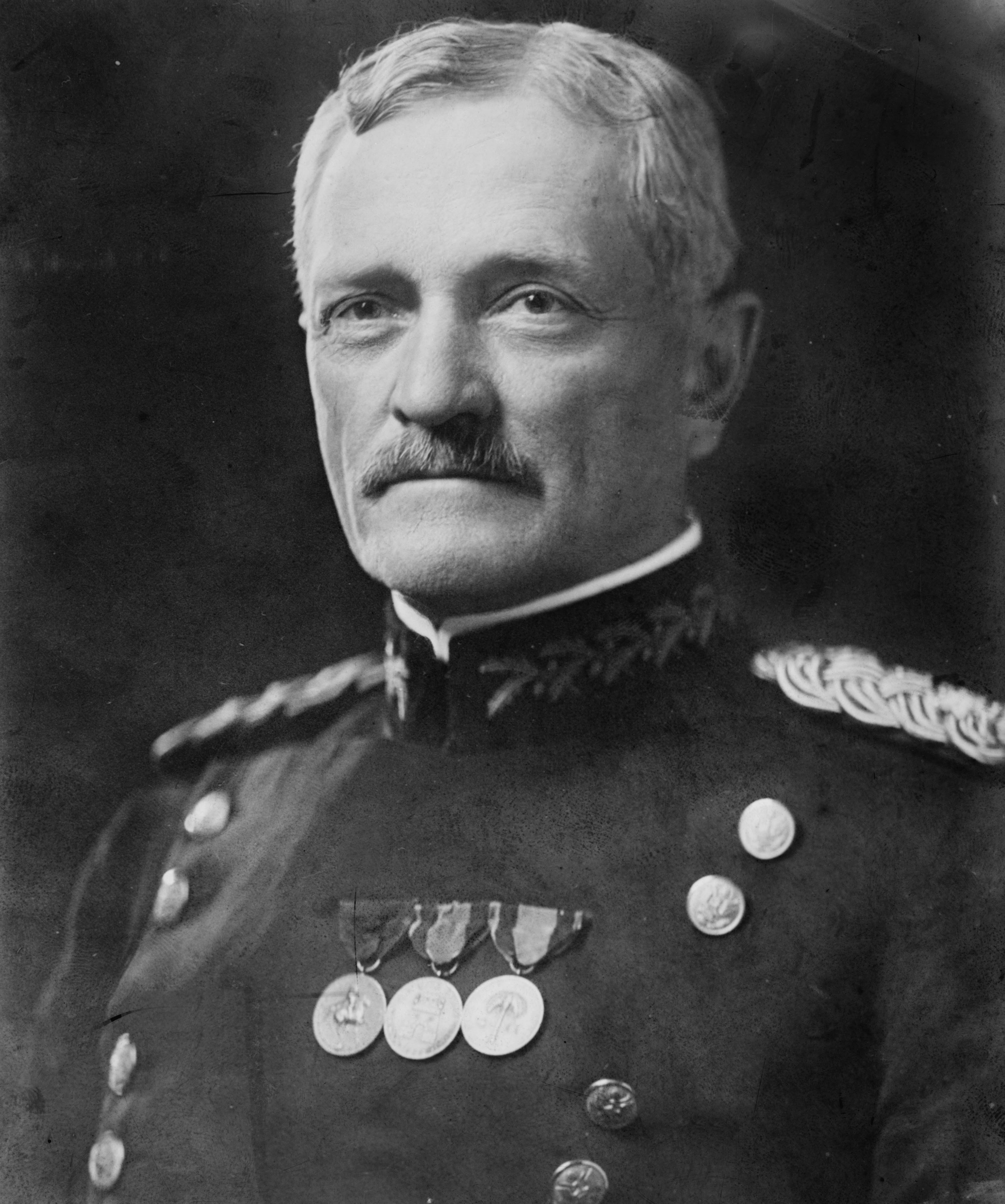
John J. Pershing: American army general, educator, and founder of the Pershing Rifles (1886)

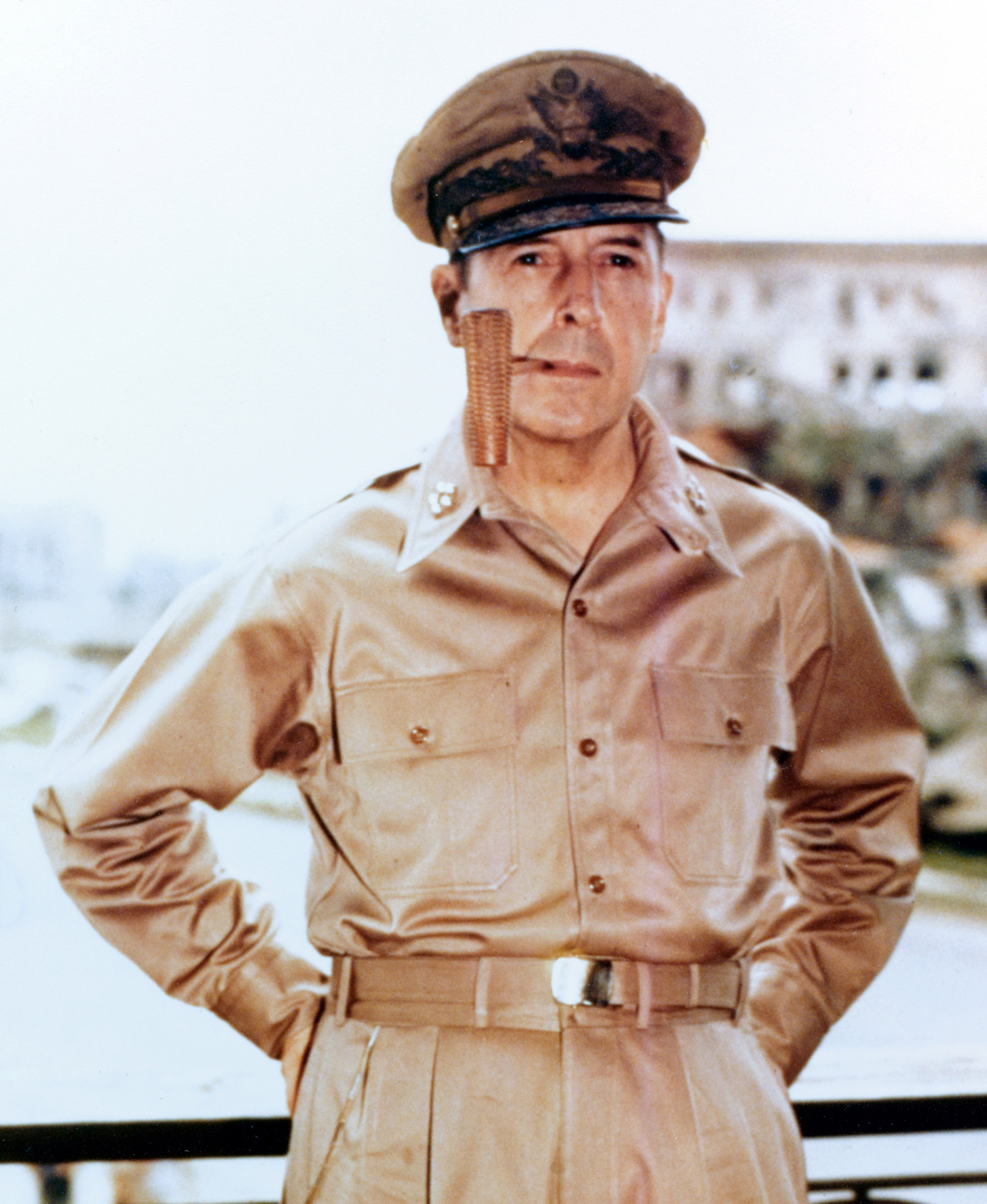
Douglas MacArthur: American general and former chief of staff of the United States Army (1903)

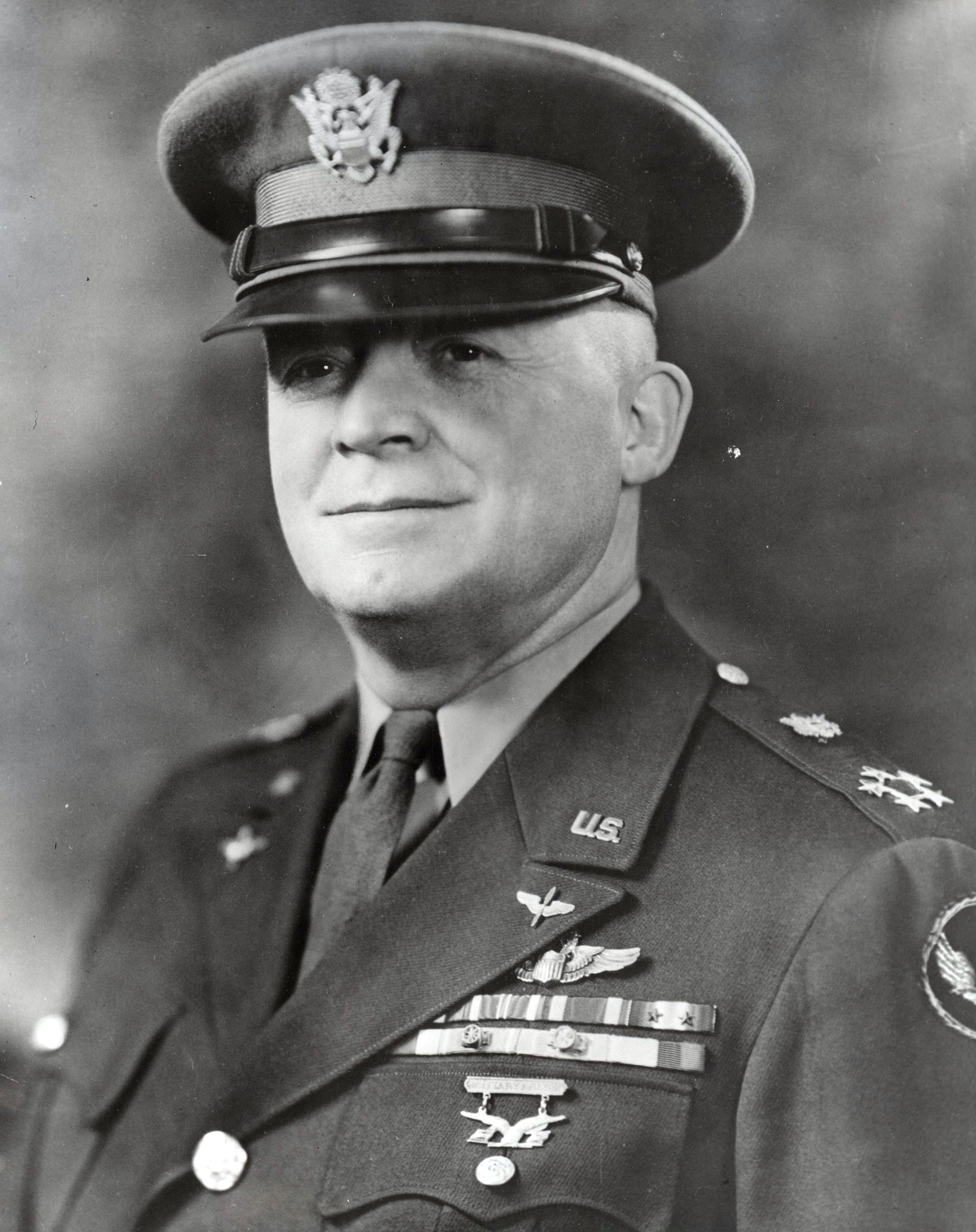
Henry H. Arnold: Fleet commander and General of the Air Force (1907)

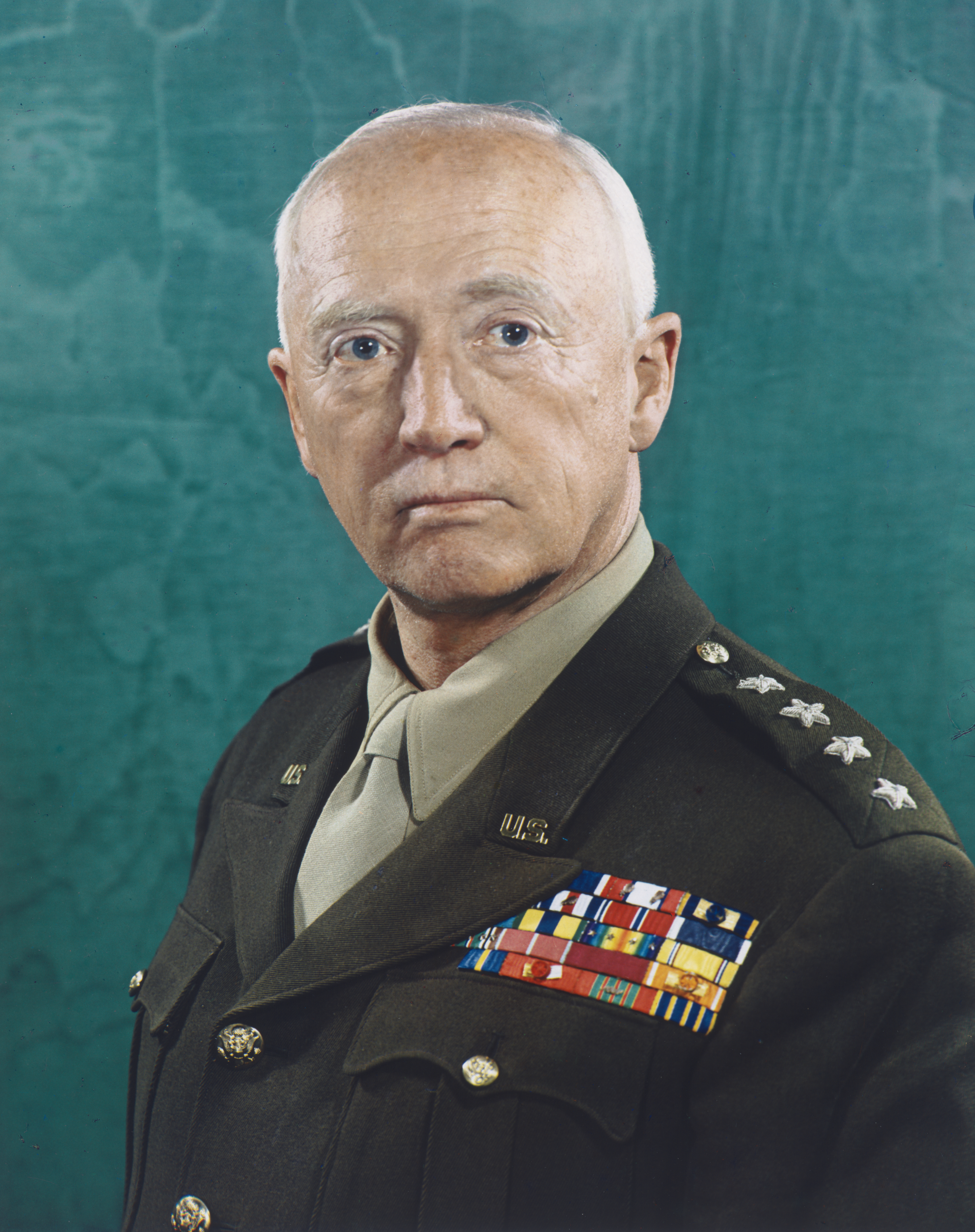
George S. Patton: United States Army general (1909)

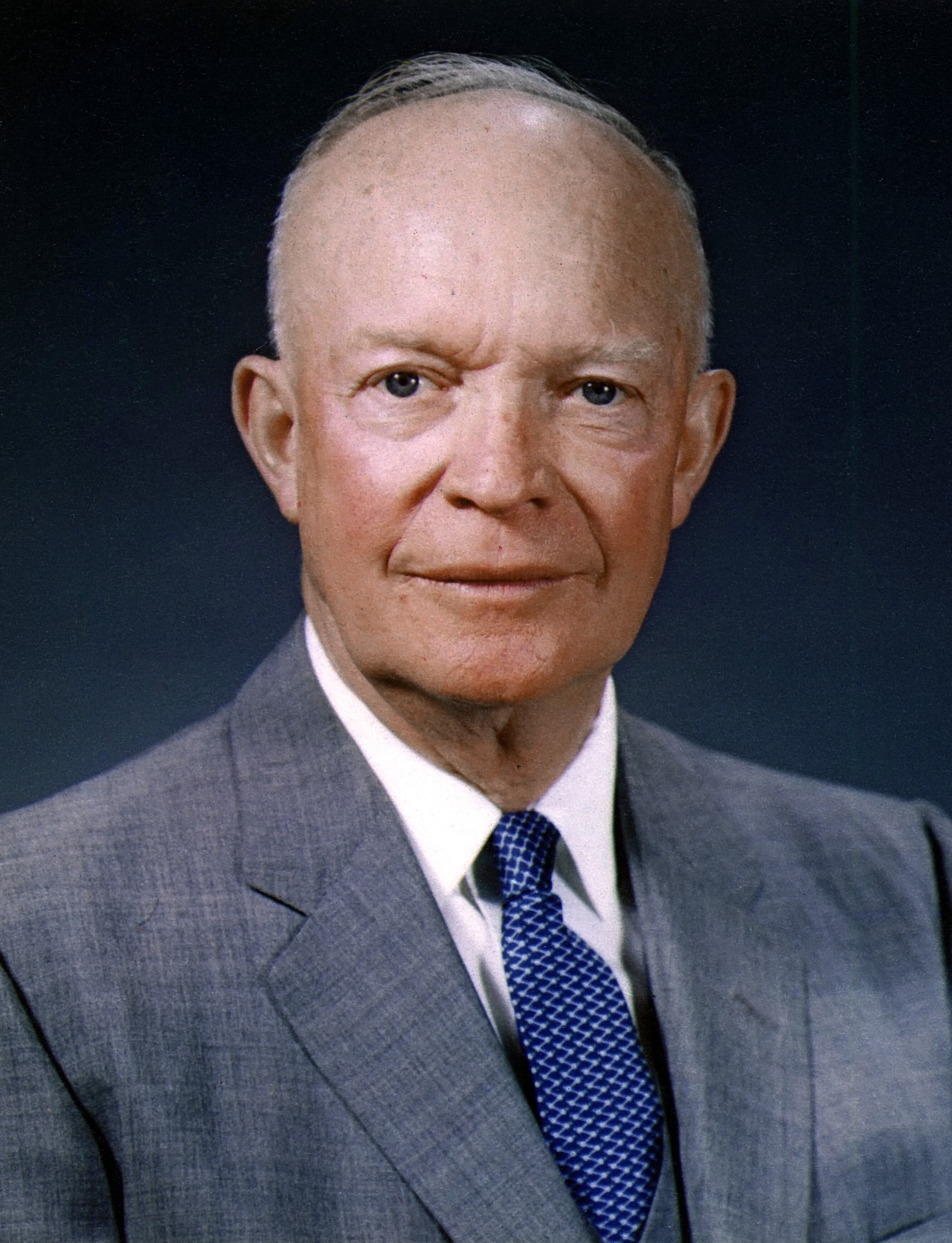
Dwight D. Eisenhower: 34th President of the United States (1915)

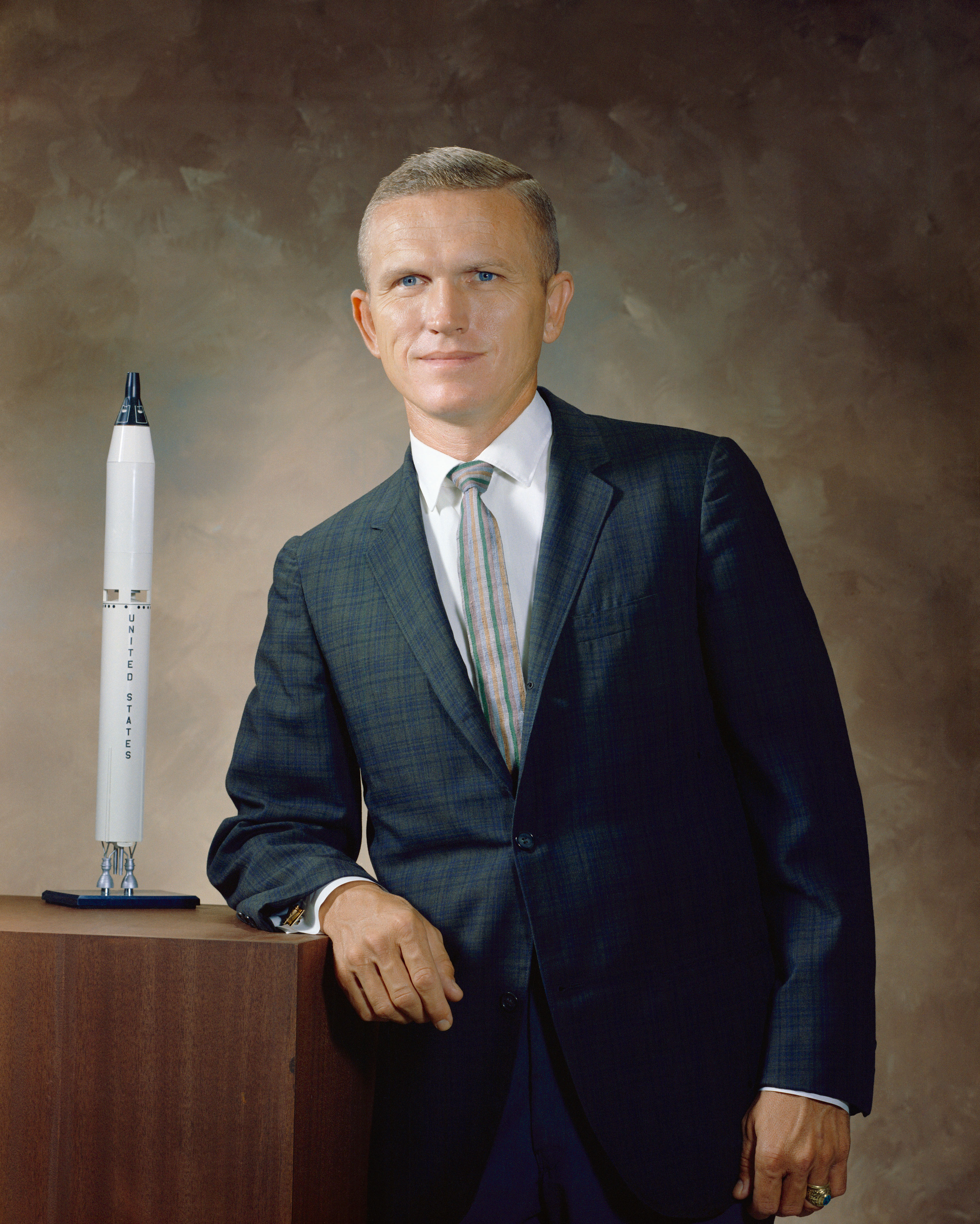
Frank Borman: Commander of Apollo 8, the first mission to orbit the Moon (1950)

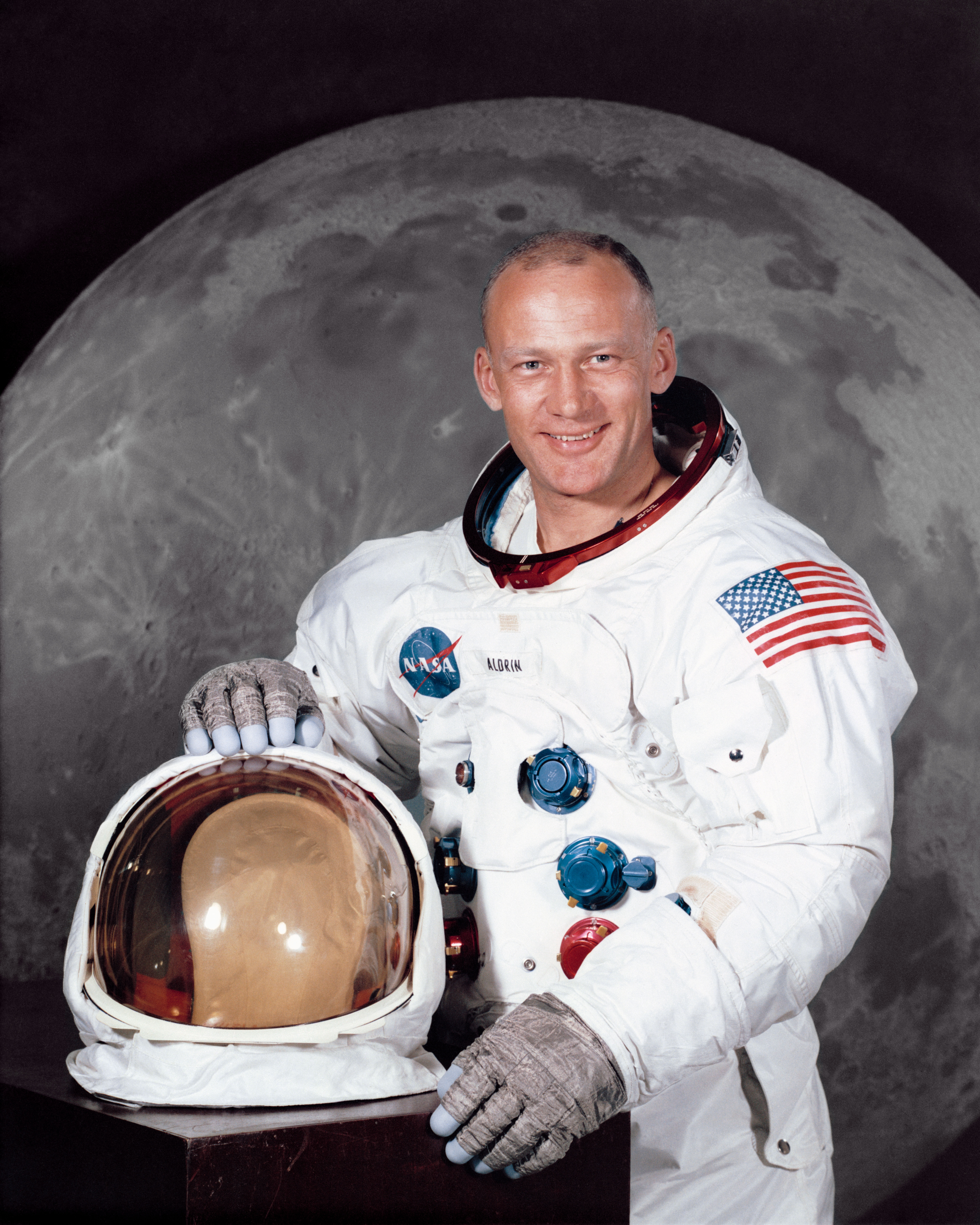
Buzz Aldrin: Pilot of Gemini 12 and Lunar Module Eagle pilot on the Apollo 11 mission (1951)

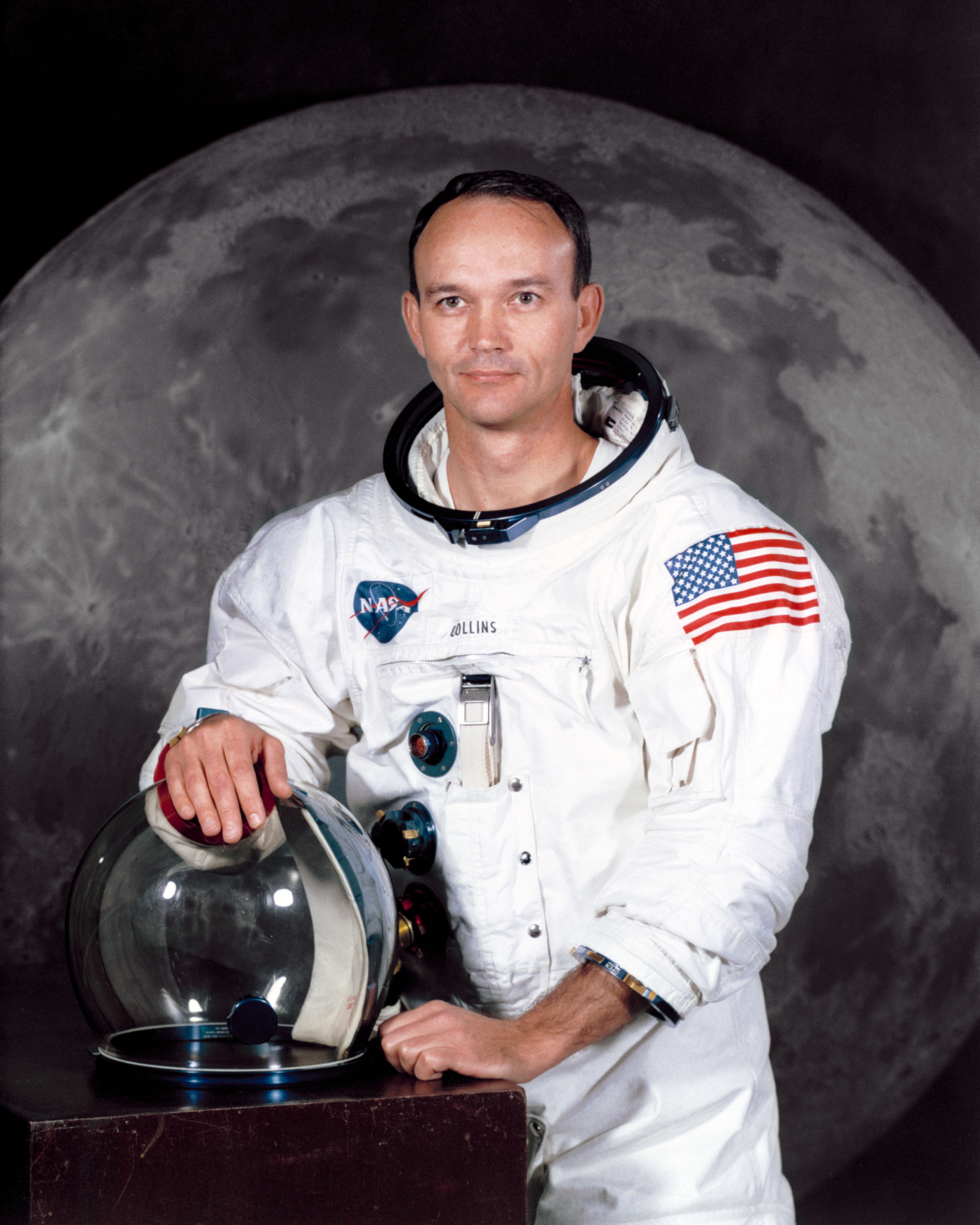
Michael Collins: Command module pilot on the Apollo 11 mission (1952)

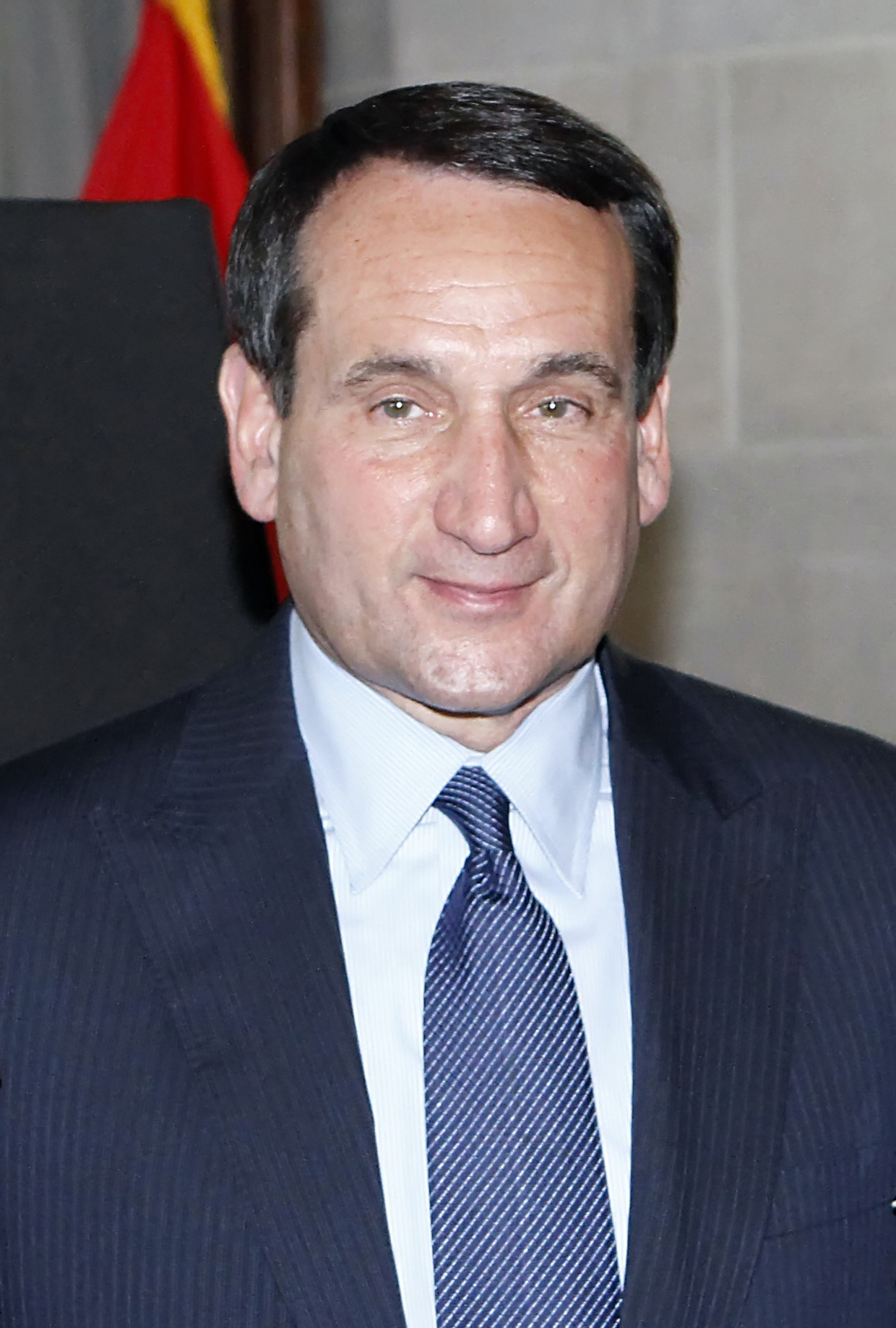
Mike Krzyzewski: Hall of Fame collegiate basketball coach for Duke University (1969)

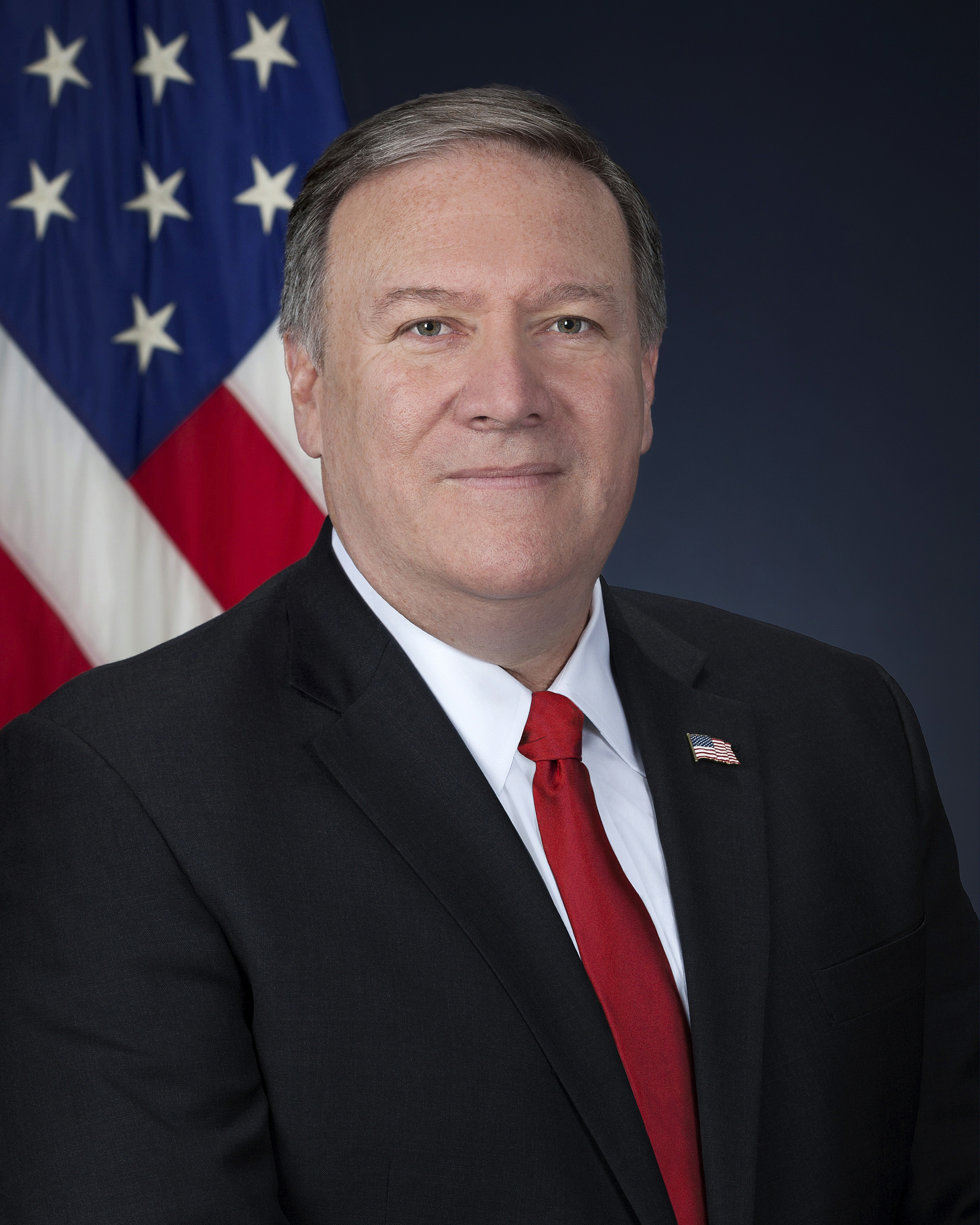
Mike Pompeo: Director of the CIA and U.S. Secretary of State (1986)

An unofficial motto of the academy's history department is "Much of the history we teach was made by people we taught." Graduates of the academy refer to themselves as "The Long Gray Line," a phrase taken from the academy's traditional hymn "The Corps." The academy has produced just under 65,000 alumni, including two Presidents of the United States: Ulysses S. Grant and Dwight D. Eisenhower; the president of the Confederate States of America, Jefferson Davis; and four foreign heads of state or government: Former Nicaraguan President Anastasio Somoza Debayle, Former Philippine President Fidel V. Ramos, Former Costa Rican President José María Figueres, and Current Cambodian Prime Minister Hun Manet. Alumni currently serving in public office include Senator Jack Reed and Congressmen Warren Davidson, Mark Green, and Brett Guthrie.

=== Military leaders ===
The academy has graduated many notable leaders since its inception in 1802. During the Civil War, a West Point graduate commanded one or both armies in every one of the 60 major battles of the war. Graduates included Ulysses S. Grant, George McClellan, George G. Meade, Phillip Sheridan, William Tecumseh Sherman, John Bell Hood, Stonewall Jackson, Robert E. Lee, Simon Bolivar Buckner, James Longstreet, J.E.B. Stuart and Oliver O. Howard. (Note: Howard was later known for the founding of Howard University.) George Armstrong Custer graduated last in his class of 1861 (34th out of a starting class of 108 candidates, 68 passing the entrance exam, of whom 34 graduated). The Spanish–American War saw the first combat service of Lt. (later, Brigadier General) John "Gatling Gun" Parker, the first Army officer to employ machine guns in offensive fire support of infantry and Brig. General Irving Hale, who holds the highest grade point average from the academy, and helped found the VFW.

During World War I, academy alumni included General of the Armies John J. Pershing, and Major Generals Charles T. Menoher and Mason Patrick. West Point was the alma mater of many notable World War II generals, Henry H. Arnold, Omar Bradley, Mark Wayne Clark, Robert L. Eichelberger, James M. Gavin, Leslie Groves, Douglas MacArthur, George S. Patton, Joseph Stilwell, Maxwell D. Taylor, James Van Fleet, Jonathan Mayhew Wainwright IV, and Simon Bolivar Buckner, Jr. the highest ranking General to be killed in combat during World War II, with many of these graduates also serving in commanding roles in the Korean War. During the Vietnam War, notable graduates general officers included Creighton Abrams, Hal Moore, and William Westmoreland. West Point also produced some famous generals and statesmen of recent note including John Abizaid, Stanley A. McChrystal, Wesley Clark, Alexander Haig, Barry McCaffrey, Norman Schwarzkopf, Jr., Brent Scowcroft, Lloyd Austin, and former Director of the Central Intelligence Agency, retired General David Petraeus.

A total of 76 graduates have been awarded the Medal of Honor.

West Point has also graduated 18 NASA astronauts, including five who went to the Moon.

=== Business ===
- Mark Clouse, president of the NFL's Washington Commanders and former CEO of Campbell's
- Jim Kimsey, co-founder of AOL
- Bob McDonald, United States secretary of veterans affairs (2014–2017) and former CEO of Procter & Gamble
- Alex Gorsky, CEO of Johnson & Johnson
- Keith McLoughlin, CEO of Electrolux
- Alden Partridge, founder of Norwich University
- Bill Roedy, former CEO of MTV Europe

=== Sports ===
Contributions to sport include three Heisman Trophy winners: Glenn Davis, Doc Blanchard, and Pete Dawkins. Abner Doubleday, once thought by some to have created baseball, graduated from West Point in 1842.

=== Government ===
West Point alumni include many prominent government officials, including Brent Scowcroft, the National Security Advisor under presidents Gerald Ford and George H. W. Bush, and Eric Shinseki, former Secretary of Veterans Affairs under President Barack Obama. West Point graduate Frank Medina organized and led the nationwide campaign that brought the Congressional Gold Medal to the 65th Infantry Regiment, also known as the Borinqueneers.

Among American universities, the academy is fifth on the list of total winners for Rhodes Scholarships, seventh for Marshall Scholarships and fourth on the list of Hertz Fellowships. The official alumni association of West Point is the West Point Association of Graduates (WPAOG or AOG), headquartered at Herbert Hall.

== West Point Garrison and Stewart Army Subpost ==
As an active-duty U.S. Army installation, there are several regular Army units that provide support for the USMA and the West Point installation. The U.S. Army Garrison includes a Headquarters and Headquarters Company, Provost Marshal and Military Police, Religious Program Support, Keller Army Community Hospital, the West Point Dental Activity, the USMA Band (a regular Army band—USMA cadets are not members of the USMA band), and the Directorate of Human Resources (DHR). The DHR is the higher headquarters for: Military Personnel Division (MPD), Army Continuing Education System (ACES), Administrative Services Division (ASD) and the Army Substance Abuse Program (ASAP).

The 1st Battalion, 1st Infantry Regiment (1–1 INF) and the 2d Army Aviation Detachment, both stationed on nearby Stewart Army Subpost, provide military training and aviation support to the USMA and the West Point Garrison. Additionally, active duty Army support is sometimes provided by the 10th Mountain Division, based at Fort Drum, NY.

== See also ==
- United States service academies
  - U.S. Air Force Academy (USAFA)
  - U.S. Coast Guard Academy (USCGA)
  - U.S. Merchant Marine Academy (USMMA)
  - U.S. Military Academy (USMA; Army)
  - U.S. Naval Academy (USNA)
- United States Military Academy grounds and facilities
- List of monuments at the United States Military Academy
- Kosciuszko's Garden
- Army University
- Redoubt Four (West Point)
- West Point Cadets' Sword
- West Point Band
- The Jazz Knights
- Ten Gentlemen from West Point (film)
