= West Point Cemetery =

US Military Academy cemetery

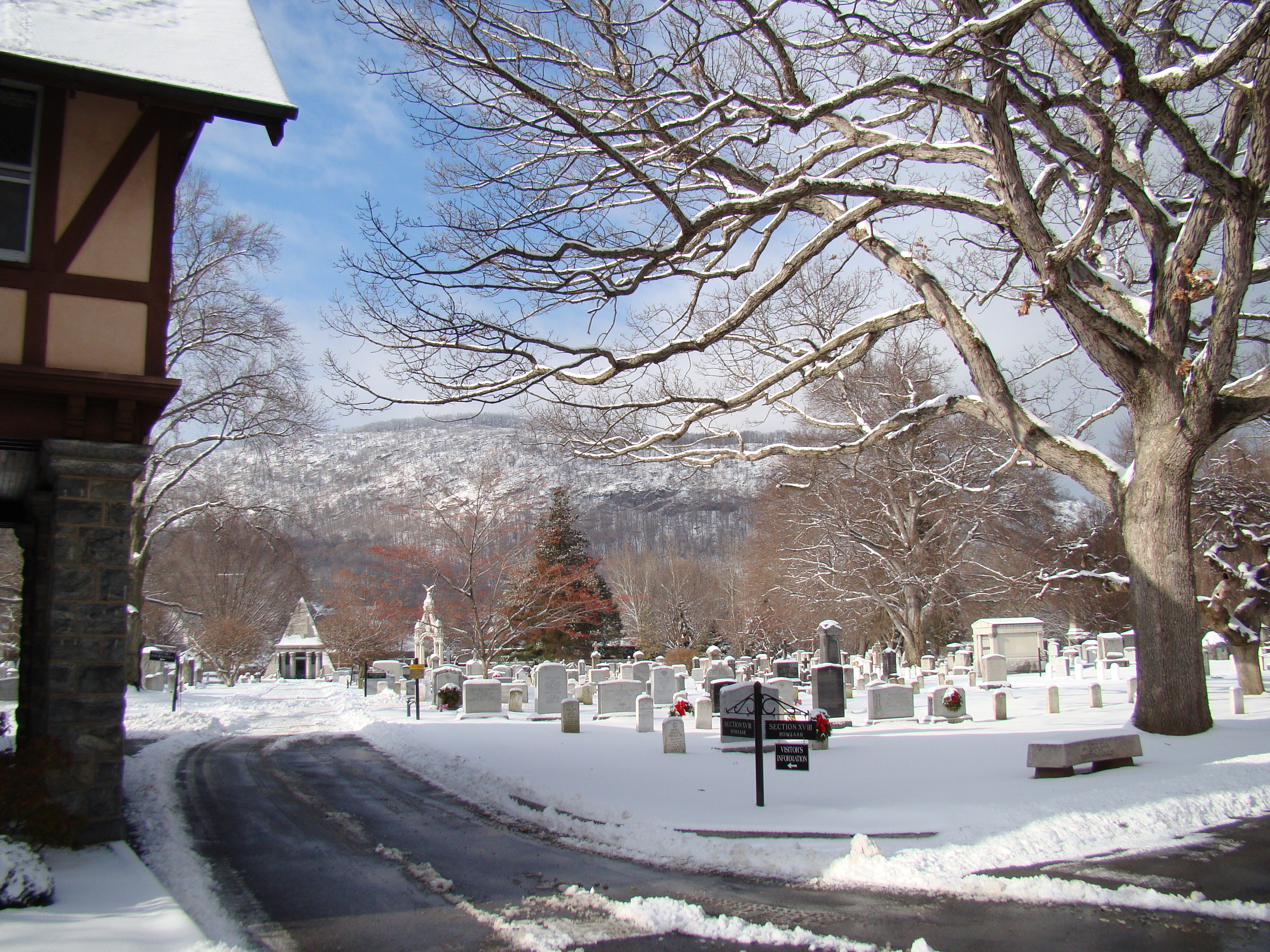
- West Point Cemetery's old section in January 2009
- Interactive map of West Point Cemetery

Details
- Established: 1817, 209 years ago
- Location: U.S. Military Academy; West Point, New York, U.S.
- Country: United States
- Coordinates: 41°23′56″N 73°58′02″W
- Type: Military
- Owned by: U.S. Military Academy
- No. of graves: Approximately 10,000
- Website: https://www.westpoint.edu/about/west-point-cemetery

Location of West Point Cemetery in the United States
Location of West Point Cemetery in New York state

West Point Cemetery is a historic cemetery on the grounds of the United States Military Academy in West Point, New York, United States. It overlooks the Hudson River, and served as a burial ground for Continental Army soldiers during the American Revolutionary War, and for early West Point residents prior to its designation as a military cemetery in 1817.

Northwest of the cadet area, it was known as "German Flats" before its formal designation as the official cemetery in 1817. Until that time several small burial plots scattered in mid-post also served as places of interment. The graves from these plots and the remains subsequently found during building excavations were removed to the new site.

An improved road to the cemetery was constructed in 1840, and the caretaker's cottage was erected in 1872. The cemetery is home to several monuments, including the Dade Monument, Cadet Monument, Custer Monument, Wood's Monument, and Margaret Corbin Monument.

== Notable interments ==
The cemetery includes interments of many notable people:

- Brigadier General Clare Hibbs Armstrong, commanded Anti-Aircraft defense of Antwerp during World War II
- Major General Robert Anderson, Union Army officer in command of Fort Sumter at start of the Civil War
- Earl "Red" Blaik, Army football head coach (1941–1958), member of the College Football Hall of Fame
- Frank Borman, American Astronaut, Commander of Apollo 8
- John Milton Brannan, Union army general
- Paul Bucha, US Army Captain
- Major General John Buford, Union cavalry commander who set the stage for the Battle of Gettysburg
- Major General Daniel Butterfield, composer of Taps
- Eugene Asa Carr, Medal of Honor recipient
- General Lucius D. Clay, "Father of the Berlin Airlift"
- Margaret Corbin, Revolutionary War heroine.
- Brevet Lieutenant Colonel Alonzo Cushing, Union artillery officer, killed during Pickett's Charge at Gettysburg; posthumously awarded the Medal of Honor in 2014
- Brevet Major General George Armstrong Custer, Union cavalry commander during the Civil War and the Indian Wars, killed at the Battle of the Little Bighorn
- Glenn Davis, Heisman Trophy winner for 1946
- Maggie Dixon, women's basketball coach at West Point, 2005–2006
- Major General Halstead Dorey, Commanded 4th Infantry Regiment during World War I; recipient of Distinguished Service Cross
- Major General John M. Devine, commanded 8th Armored Division during World War II;
- Captain Philip Egner, the longtime director of the West Point Band and composer of the West Point fight song "On, Brave Old Army Team."
- Brigadier General John Eisenhower, historian, author, son of Dwight Eisenhower.
- Lieutenant General James Maurice Gavin, commander of the 82nd Airborne Division during World War II
- Major General George Washington Goethals, "Builder of the Panama Canal"
- Major General Frederick Dent Grant, son of President Ulysses S. Grant
- Lieutenant General Howard Dwayne Graves, Superintendent, United States Military Academy
- Major General William H. Hay, commander of the 28th Infantry Division in World War I
- Major General Ethan Allen Hitchcock, Mexican–American War veteran, special advisor to the president during the Civil War
- Brigadier General Ranald S. Mackenzie, Civil War veteran, commander of Buffalo Soldiers during the Indian Wars
- Master Sergeant Martin "Marty" Maher, Jr., athletic trainer and central character in the film The Long Gray Line
- Colonel David "Mickey" Marcus, Israel's first general, only American buried here who died fighting under a foreign flag
- Brigadier General Tully McCrea. Civil War veteran, artillery officer.

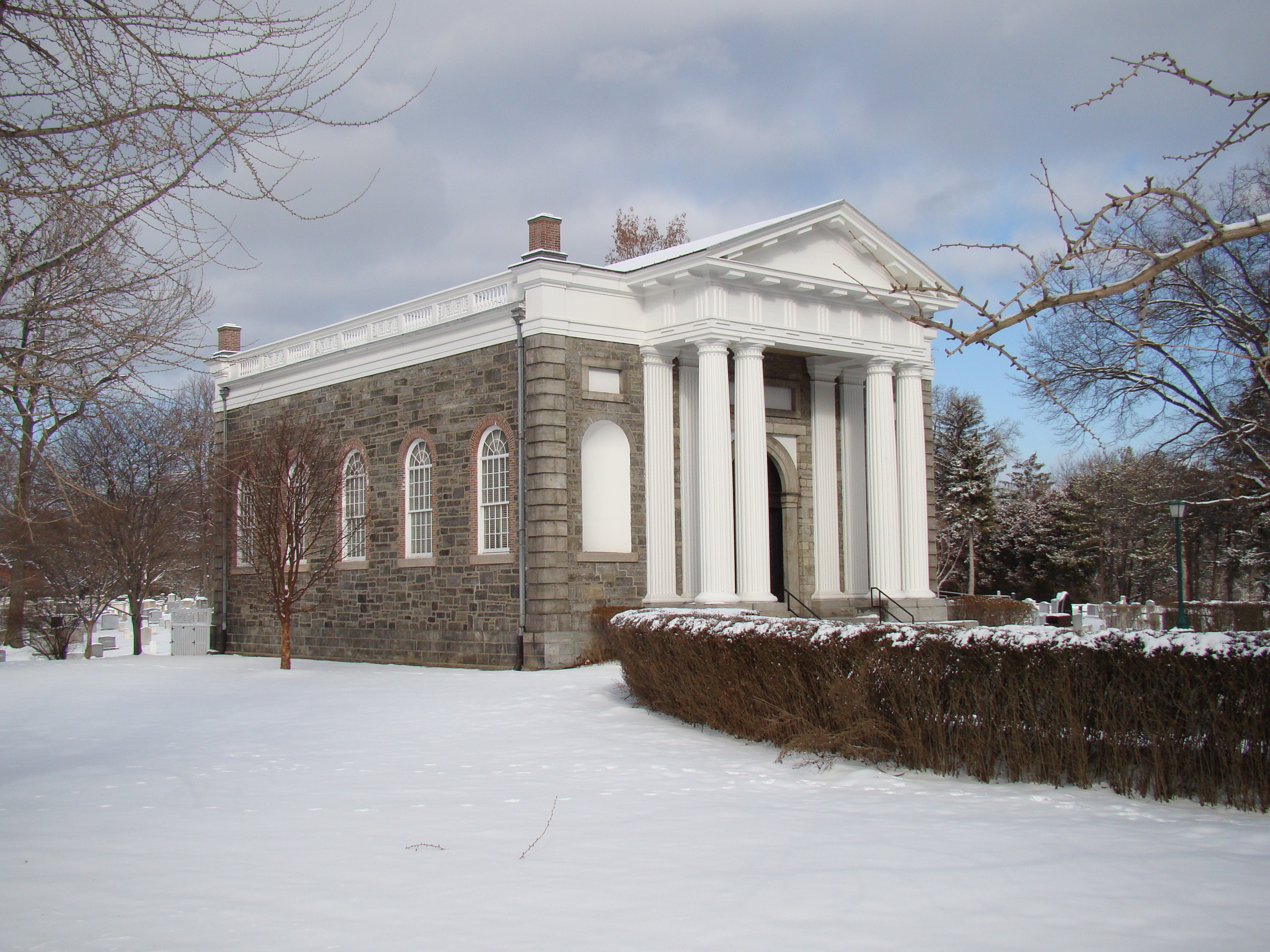
Old Cadet Chapel at the entrance to the cemetery

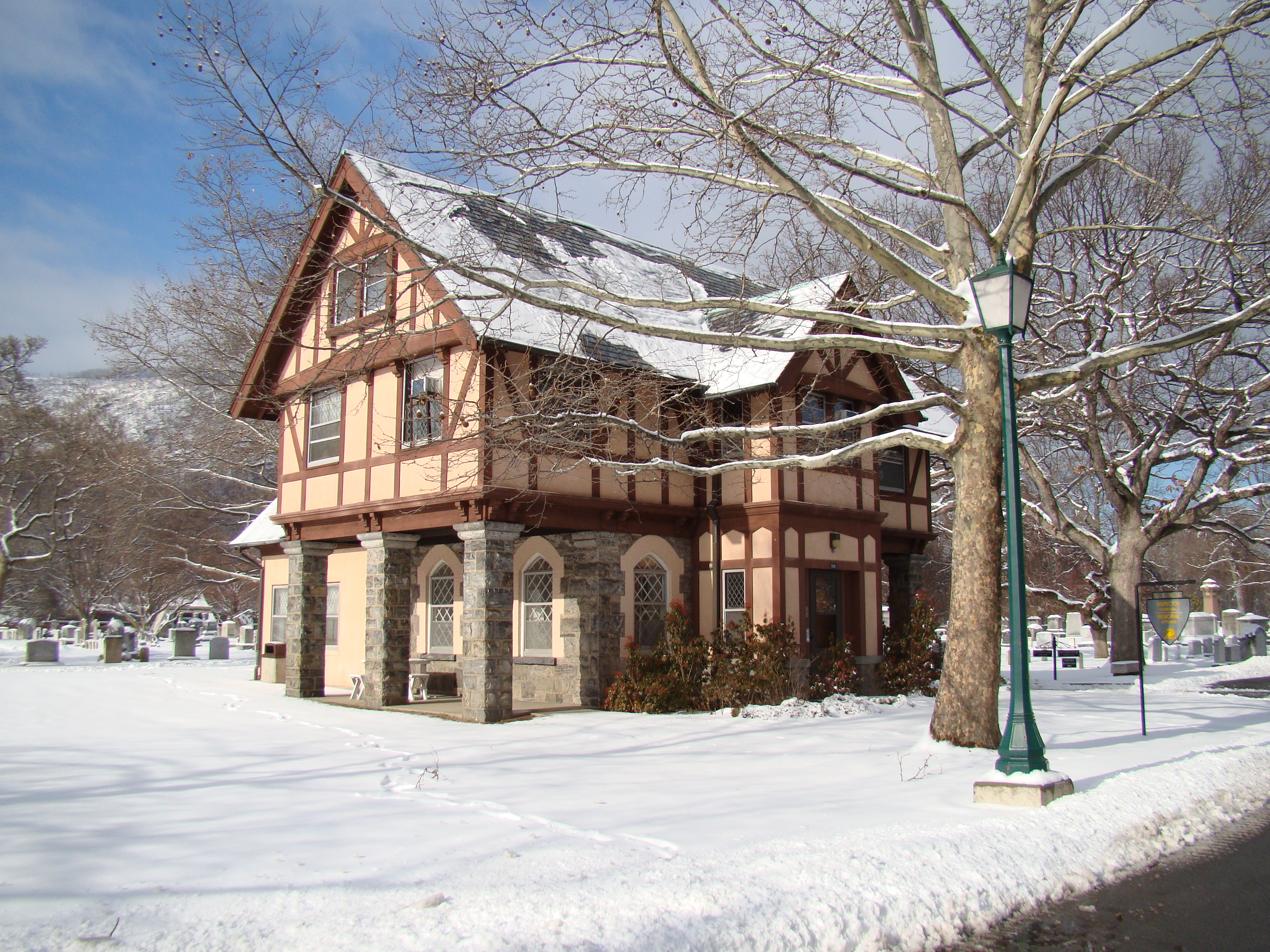
Caretaker's Cottage

- Major General Wesley Merritt, Civil War veteran, Military Governor of the Philippines
- Major General Bryant Edward Moore, Korea IX corps, World War II 8th Infantry Division "Timberwolves" and Pacific Theatre.
- General Alexander M. Patch, commander of U.S. Seventh Army
- 2nd Lieutenant Emily J. T. Perez, † Iraq – 2006, NCAA Award of Valor – 2008.
- Colonel Russell Potter "Red" Reeder, Jr., World War II veteran and author.
- Major General Thomas H. Ruger, Civil War veteran, United States Military Academy Superintendent
- Major General Herbert Norman Schwarzkopf Sr., the first superintendent of the New Jersey State Police.
- Major General George Van Horn Moseley, Nazi sympathizer who was chosen as a potential military dictator for a planned coup by George E. Deatherage
- General H. Norman Schwarzkopf Jr., commander of coalition forces in the Gulf War.
- Lieutenant General Winfield Scott, longest serving American general (1813–1861), commanded the U.S. Army from 1841 to 1861.
- Major General George Sykes, Civil War general and corps commander.
- Brigadier General Sylvanus Thayer, known as "The Father of the U.S. Military Academy" for the strict regimens implemented at his direction
- Brigadier General John T. Thompson, inventor of the Thompson submachine gun
- Brevet Major General John Caldwell Tidball, Civil War veteran, commandant of the U.S. Army Artillery School.
- Brigadier General George H. Torney, Surgeon General of the United States Army
- Major General John A. Wickham Jr., U.S. Army General
- Ensign Dominick Trant, a native of Cork, Ireland and a soldier in the Ninth Massachusetts Regiment in the Continental Army, died at West Point in 1782. His grave is the oldest in the cemetery.
- Colonel Theodore S. Westhusing, highest-ranking officer to die in Iraq War – 2005, "Multi-national Security Transition Command – Iraq".
- General William Westmoreland, Army Chief of Staff, Superintendent, U.S. Military Academy, Commander of Military Assistance Command, Vietnam from 1964 to 1968.
- Lieutenant Colonel Ed White, first American to make a spacewalk, killed in the Apollo 1 fire on 27 January 1967.
- Brevet Lieutenant Colonel Eleazer D. Wood, first West Point Graduate to die in battle. Actually a cenotaph; arguable whether he is actually buried there.

== See also ==
- Military funeral
- Category:Burials at West Point Cemetery
- West Point Cadet Chapel
