= Russell Reeder =

United States Army officer and author (1902–1998)

Russell P. Reeder Jr.
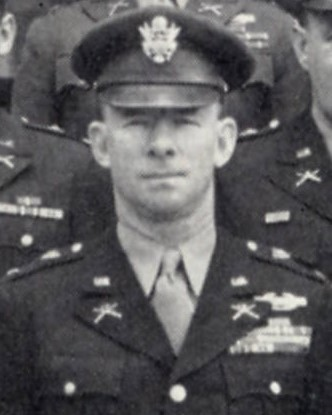
- At West Point in 1946
- Born: March 4, 1902; Fort Leavenworth, Kansas, United States
- Died: February 22, 1998 (aged 95); Hybla Valley, Virginia, United States
- Burial place: West Point Cemetery, New York, United States
- Spouse: Dorothea Darrah
- Military career
- Allegiance: United States
- Branch: United States Army
- Service years: 1926–1948
- Rank: Colonel
- Nickname: "Red"
- Service number: 0-16494
- Unit: Infantry Branch
- Commands: 12th Infantry Regiment
- Conflicts: World War II
- Awards: Distinguished Service Cross; Silver Star; Legion of Merit; Bronze Star; Purple Heart; Combat Infantryman Badge; Croix de Guerre; Légion d'honneur
- Other work: Writer

Colonel Russell Potter "Red" Reeder Jr. (March 4, 1902 – February 22, 1998) was a United States Army officer and writer.

== Biography ==
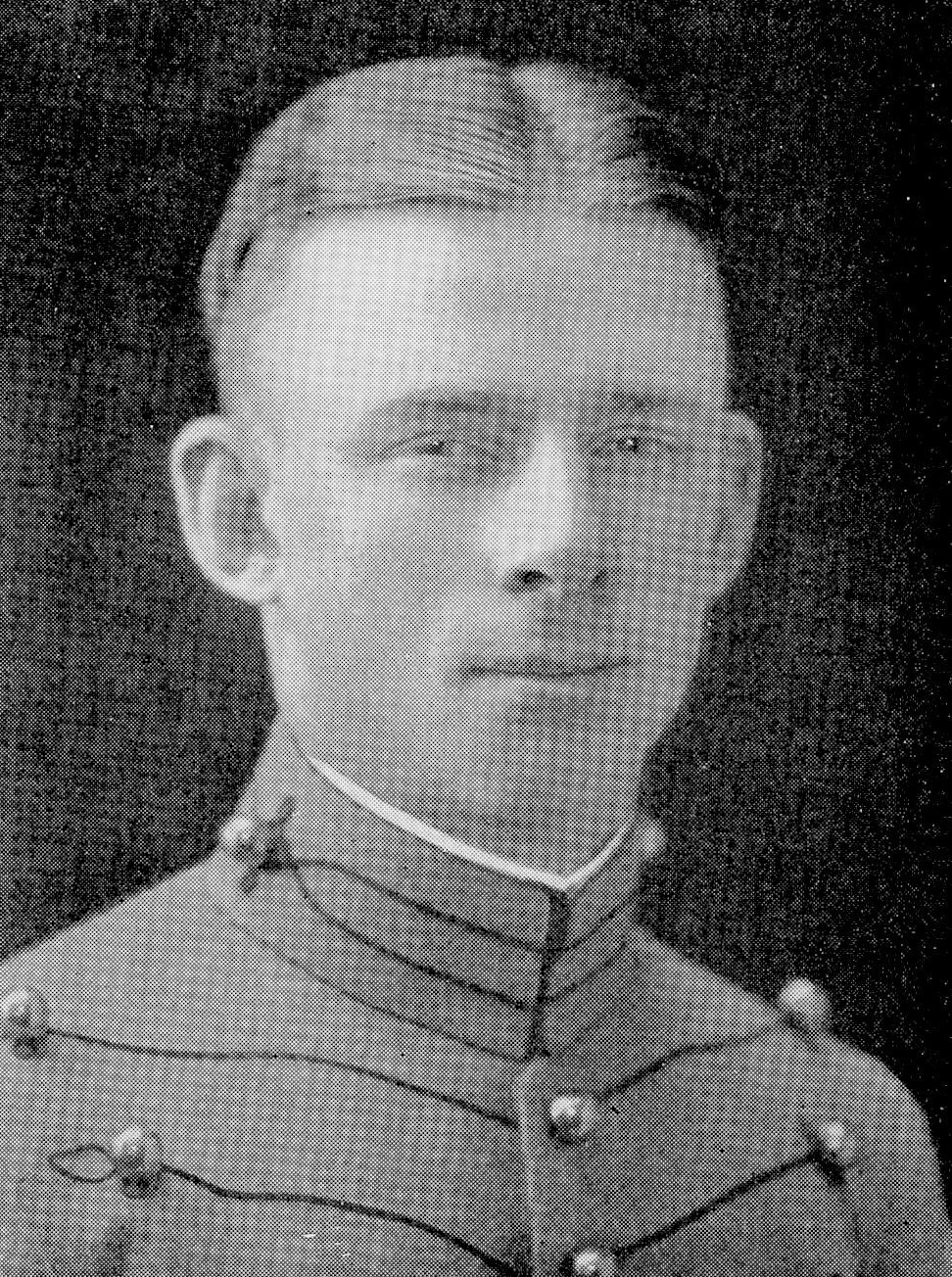
At West Point in 1926

Reeder was born at Fort Leavenworth, Kansas, on March 4, 1902. His father, Russell Potter Reeder Sr., was an officer in the United States Army, and Reeder and his family moved to different military bases around the country. He wrote about his upbringing in the book Born at Reveille. At the age of eleven, he saved the life of a drowning younger child in Casco Bay, Maine. He was awarded the Treasury Department Silver Lifesaving Medal for this achievement in August 1913. Reeder entered the United States Military Academy at West Point, New York in June 1920 with an appointment from Alabama, played football and baseball as a cadet, and graduated as a member of the Class of 1926. His graduation was delayed by two leaves of absence: January to July 1921 and January to August 1924. Reeder married Dorothea Darrah in 1934.

During the Japanese attack on Pearl Harbor in December 1941, Reeder was stationed in California. Later that year, he was transferred to the War Department Operations Division, on Chief of Staff General George C. Marshall's general staff in Washington, D.C. In 1943, Reeder prepared a staff study proposing a "ground medal" comparable to the "Air Medal" already being given for "meritorious service while in 'aerial flight.'" The report presented to Lieutenant General Lesley J. McNair, then in charge of the Army Ground Forces, was forwarded to General Marshall and resulted in the creation of the Bronze Star Medal by President Franklin D. Roosevelt in February 1944.

In April 1944, Reeder was assigned to command the 12th Infantry Regiment of the 4th Infantry Division. Reeder's regiment of 3,200 soldiers fought on Utah Beach during D-Day. On June 11, 1944, during the Battle of Normandy, Reeder received a shrapnel wound to his ankle that almost severed his left leg. Reeder was taken back to England, then to the Walter Reed Army Hospital in Washington, where his lower leg was amputated. He retired because of his disability in September 1945, but remained on active duty until October 1948.

In October 1945, Reeder returned to West Point as regimental tactical officer of the 2nd Regiment, Corps of Cadets, serving until October 1947. He then became an assistant athletic director at West Point. Reeder quit this job after 20 years in 1967 and pursued a career in nonfiction writing. Of his nonfiction works, Medal of Honor Heroes and The West Point Story were written for the Landmark series of historical literature for children. Reeder's other titles include "The Civil War Story," "The Northern Generals," and "The Southern Generals." His narrative account of Colonel Ranald S. Mackenzie's May 19, 1873 black operation against Mexican bandits titled "The Mackenzie Raid" served as the inspiration for a 39-episode television series first aired in 1958 titled Mackenzie's Raiders.

Reeder's sister Nardi Reeder Campion was an author and co-wrote Marty Maher's Bringing Up the Brass that was filmed as The Long Grey Line with Nardi co-writing the screenplay. Red Reeder had a cameo as the Commandant of Cadets in the film, distributing diplomas to the class of 1915.

In 1965, Reeder and his wife Dorothea moved to Garrison, New York where she helped to edit his books. In 1989, they moved to the Fairfax Retirement Community in Fort Belvoir, Virginia.

In 1997, Reeder was awarded the Distinguished Graduate Award by the Association of Graduates of the United States Military Academy. Reeder died of congestive heart failure at the Inova Mount Vernon Hospital in Hybla Valley, Virginia, on February 22, 1998, at the age of 95. He survived his wife and younger sister, and has four children, ten grandchildren, and twenty-two great-grandchildren.

Reeder and his wife were buried at the West Point Cemetery.

== Decorations ==
Colonel Reeder's military decorations include the Distinguished Service Cross, the Silver Star, the Legion of Merit, the Bronze Star, the Purple Heart, the Combat Infantryman Badge, and two decorations awarded by France: the Croix de Guerre avec Palm and the Légion d'honneur.
