= Wood's Monument (West Point) =

Obelisk in honor of Eleazer Derby Wood

- United States
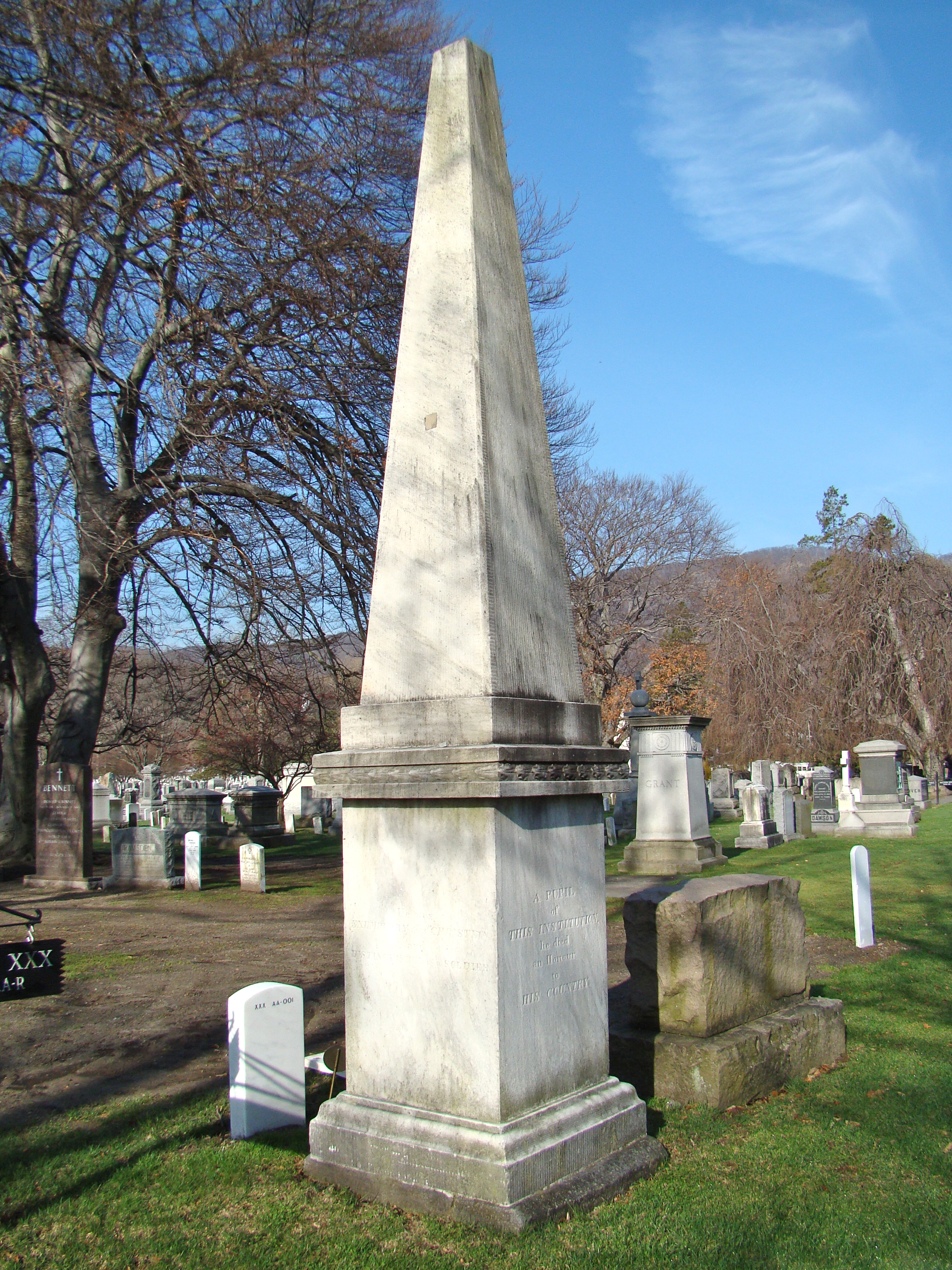
- Wood's monument in its current location in the West Point Cemetery
- For Colonel Eleazer D. Wood
- Unveiled: 1818
- Location: 41°23′57.55″N 73°57′58.3″W near Highland Falls, New York
- To the Memory of Lieut Colonel E. D. Wood of the CORPS OF ENGINEERS who fell while leading a Charge at the sortie of Fort Erie UPPER CANADA 17th September 1814 in the 31st Year of his age.

Wood's Monument is an obelisk monument in honor of Colonel Eleazer Derby Wood (1783–1814), an engineer officer and early graduate of West Point who died during the War of 1812 at the Siege of Fort Erie on 17 September 1814. Old prints of West Point show this monument located on a knoll near the flag pole. The monument was once used as a navigational aid for ships making the passage down the Hudson River.

== Eleazer Wood ==
Eleazer D. Wood (1783 – September 17, 1814) was born in Lunenburg, Massachusetts. Wood was one of the earliest graduates of the U.S. Military Academy, becoming the 17th graduate of the academy in 1806. He was well known among the army officer corps as an engineer and artillery officer. He built Fort Meigs in Ohio as well as other fortifications. Fort Wood, an early 19th-century star-shaped fortification on Bedloe's Island (named after Isaac Bedloo), now called Liberty Island, was named in his honor, as is Wood County, Ohio.

== History of the monument ==
At the conclusion of the War of 1812, Major General Jacob Brown contacted Colonel Sylvanus Thayer, Superintendent of the Military Academy, and ordered the monument's construction at West Point at his own expense. The monument is a four-sided obelisk approximately 15 feet (4.6 m) tall. Erected in 1818, it was once prominently located near the site of present-day Trophy Point. As the academy expanded, the monument was moved to the cemetery in 1885, where it is located next to the graves of the Warner sisters, Susan and Anna. Its dedication in 1818 makes it the oldest monument at the academy.

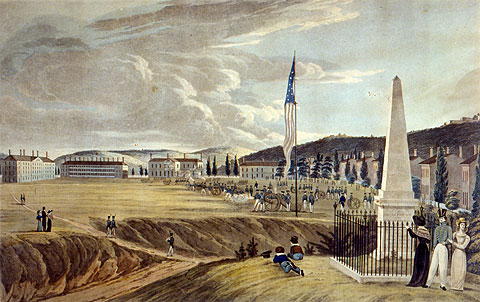
Wood's monument depicted in an 1828 painting
