= Margaret Corbin =

American soldier (1751–1800)

Margaret Cochran Corbin
- Corbin depicted on her gravestone at West Point Cemetery
- Born: Margaret Cochran; November 12, 1751; Present-day Franklin County, Pennsylvania
- Died: January 16, 1800 (aged 48); Unknown; alleged to be Westmoreland County, Pennsylvania or Highland Falls, New York
- Spouse(s): John Corbin (1772–1776); Unknown (1782)
- Military career
- Service years: 1775–1783
- Nickname: Captain Molly
- Units: 1st Pennsylvania Artillery (unofficially, 1775–1776); Invalid Corps (1780–1783)
- Conflicts: American Revolutionary War; Battle of Fort Washington

Margaret Cochran Corbin (November 12, 1751 – January 16, 1800) was an American woman who fought in the Revolutionary War. She was born in western Pennsylvania to immigrant parents. When she was five years old, Native Americans killed her father and took her mother captive, and she and her brother were raised by their maternal uncle. In 1772 she married John Corbin. When he enlisted in a Pennsylvania artillery regiment in 1775, she joined him as a camp follower, assisting in duties such as sewing, cooking, and bringing supplies to the cannon crews. At the Battle of Fort Washington on November 16, 1776, John was killed by British artillery fire. Corbin took his place at the cannon and kept it firing until she was hit three times, shortly before the fort fell.

Gravely wounded, Corbin was treated by British doctors and returned to the American side, but she never regained the use of her left arm. She became the first American woman to receive a military pension in 1779 and later enrolled in the Invalid Corps and posted to West Point, New York, where she stayed until the corps was disbanded in 1783. Where she died is uncertain, with some accounts stating that she returned to Pennsylvania and died in Westmoreland County; others state she remained near West Point and died in the village of Highland Falls.

== Early life ==
Margaret Cochran was born on November 12, 1751, in western Pennsylvania (modern-day Franklin County). Her parents, Robert and Sarah Cochran, were immigrants. The French and Indian War broke out in May 1754, when she was 4 years old. The native Delaware and Shawnee tribes, allied with the Kingdom of France, attacked English settlements in western Pennsylvania. When Cochran was 5 years old, her father was killed and her mother taken captive by Native Americans of one of those two tribes. At the time, Cochran and her brother were away; they were then raised by their maternal uncle. In 1772, at 21, she married the Virginian farmer John Corbin and adopted his surname. They lived on a small farm in Pennsylvania.

== American Revolutionary War ==
In 1775, John Corbin joined the 1st Pennsylvania Artillery Regiment of either the Pennsylvania Militia or the Continental Army. He held the position of matross, a soldier who assisted artillery gunners in loading, firing, and moving cannons. Instead of staying home, Margaret accompanied her husband as a camp follower. In this role, she sewed, cooked, did laundry, and cared for injured soldiers. In some cases, women would also bring soldiers tools and water so they could operate their cannons.

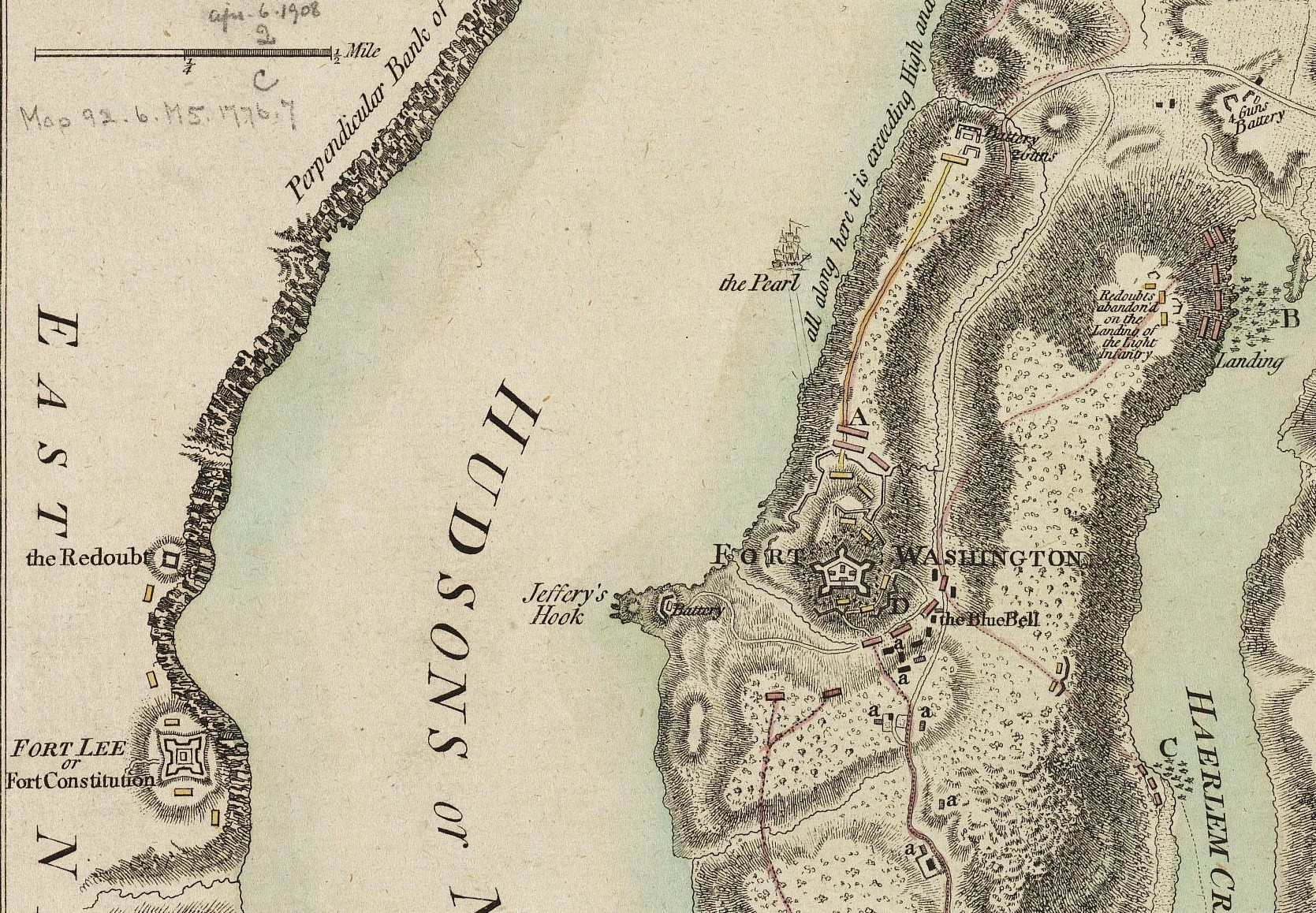
A map of the Battle of Fort Washington; Fort Tyron, where the Corbins were stationed, is in the top position labeled "Battery, 2 Guns"

Fort Washington in Manhattan was one of the last fortifications held by American troops near New York City. John's artillery regiment was moved there following the Battle of Harlem Heights in September 1776. They were assigned to the redoubt Fort Tryon, a set of outworks near Fort Washington proper. American forces retreated into New Jersey after the Battle of White Plains in October, leaving a force of around 3,000 at Fort Washington. The Battle of Fort Washington took place on November 16. A force of British troops were driven back three times by defending American forces, but British forces alongside 4,000 to 5,000 German troops from the German province of Hesse attacked American positions.

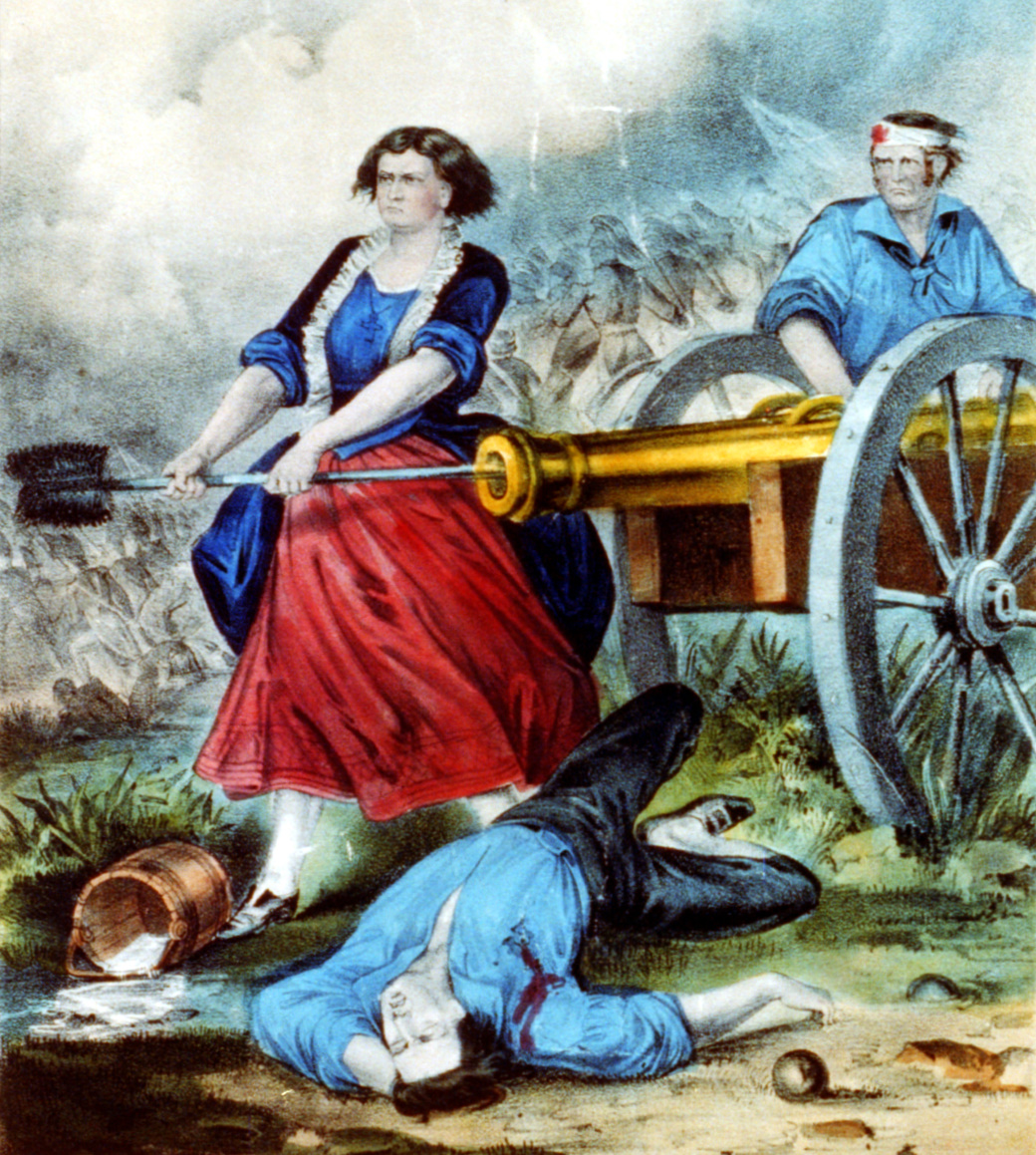
Corbin taking her husband's position became part of the story of Molly Pitcher

Just prior to the attack, the British bombarded Fort Washington. Corbin carried water to clean and cool the guns off. Some accounts also say she assisted in cleaning and loading the gun. When her husband was killed by British cannon fire, he gave a cry and sank to the ground. The officer in charge ordered the cannon to be removed, but she reportedly responded: "Let me take his place! Let the gun stay! I am ready and able to do the work!" Another account says she stepped in without saying a word. Corbin filled her husband's spot and the cannon was able to continue firing. She was struck three times by grapeshot before the American position was overrun through the rear. She was found in critical condition.

Corbin was captured by the British. Despite her life-threatening injuries, she was saved by British doctors; she would, however, lose the ability to use her left arm. Paroled to General Nathanael Greene, she was sent across the Hudson River to Fort Lee. She and several other Continental Army prisoners were released and sent to a hospital in Philadelphia. She appealed to the Government of Pennsylvania to receive financial aid for her injuries. They gave her a small sum of $30 for relief and her case was referred to the Continental Congress' Board of War. On July 6, 1779, in recognition of her actions during the Battle of Fort Washington, the Board of War granted her a lifelong pension. This consisted of half a soldier's monthly pay (£30) and a suit of clothes, or the monetary value of a suit of clothes. The Board of War later authorized an annual clothing allowance for her. She was the first American woman to receive a military pension and was nicknamed "Captain Molly".

Corbin struggled to support herself financially. In 1780, she was enrolled in the Invalid Corps, a regiment made up of wounded soldiers who could not participate in action. As a widow with no other family, she was sent to West Point, New York. She was assigned to assist wounded soldiers. She was reportedly "difficult to get along with", with a commanding officer describing her as an "offensive person" that people were unwilling to take seriously. Due to her injury, Corbin found it extremely difficult to perform basic tasks like dressing and feeding herself. According to the New York Historical, General Henry Knox supplied her with a servant to help her bathe and eat. She remarried in 1782 to an unknown man. Her ration was raised to a full one, which included rum and whiskey, and she was given a back allowance to pay for the time when the drinks had not been allotted to her. Her new husband died less than a year after they married. Corbin remained with the Invalid Corps until it was dissolved in 1783 at the conclusion of the American Revolutionary War. She was given an honorable discharge.

== Death ==
Multiple sources place Corbin's date of death as January 16, 1800. Her place of death is unknown. Some accounts have her as returning to Pennsylvania, living in Westmoreland County until she died. One account specifically lists her burial site as the graveyard in the town of Congruity. Other accounts say she is "Captain Molly" who lived near West Point from September 1785 to August 1789. These accounts place her location of death as Highland Falls, New York. Oral tradition claims she was buried "near the village".

== Legacy ==
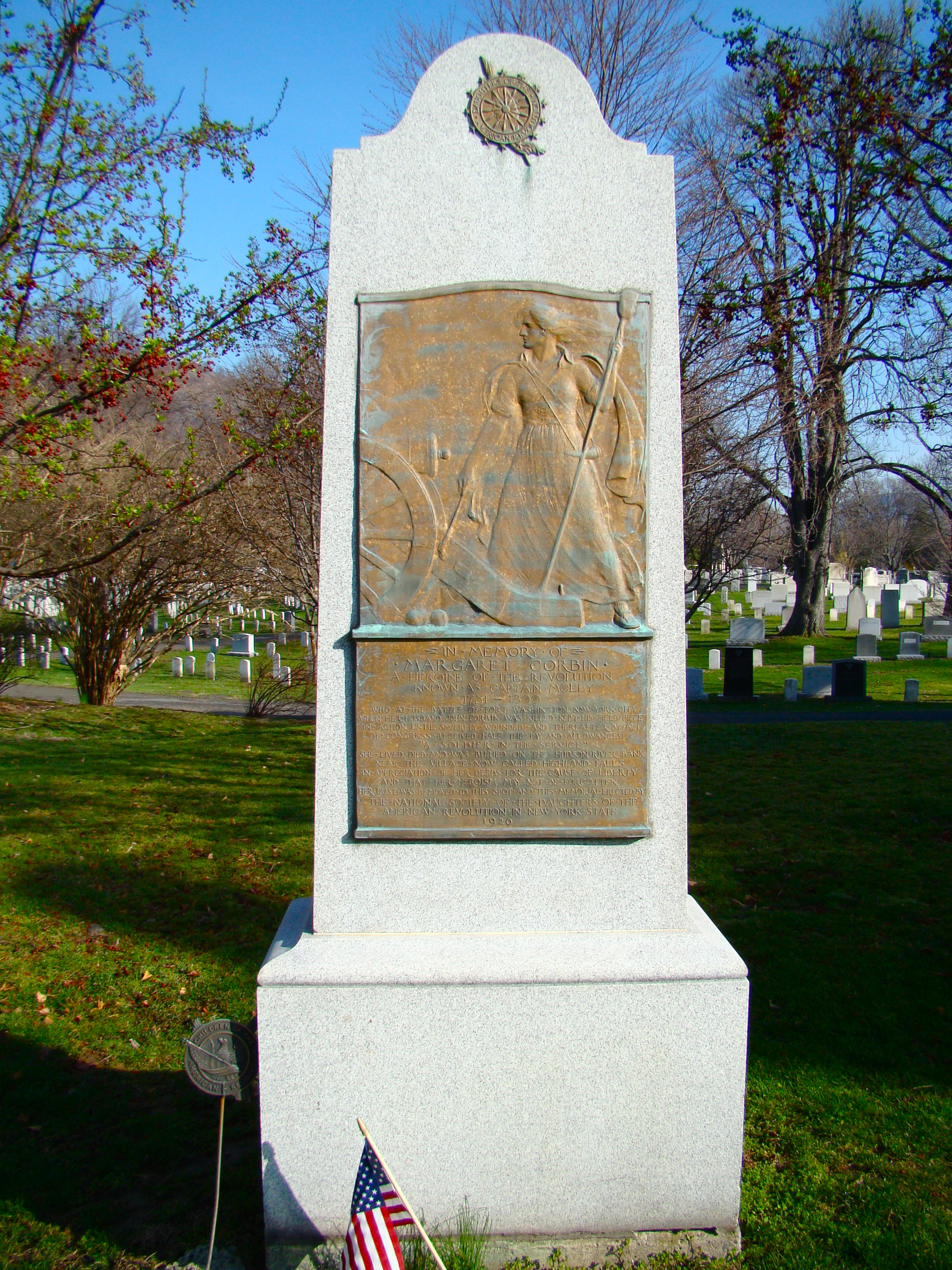
Corbin's gravestone in the West Point Cemetery

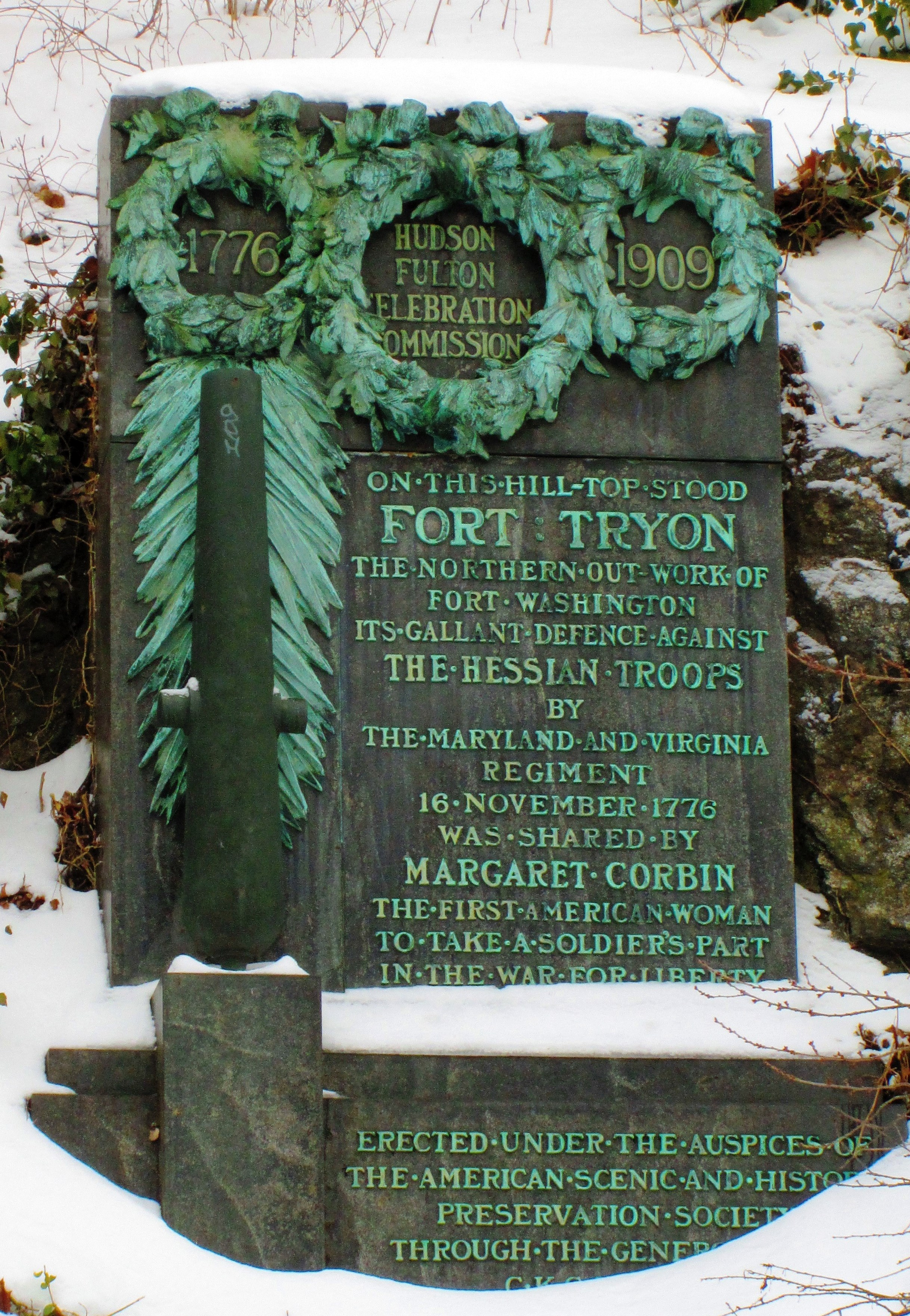
A memorial in Fort Tyron Park commemorating Corbin and her compatriots

Corbin's actions at the Battle of Fort Washington made her associated with Molly Pitcher. This came about in 1848, when Benson J. Lossing was writing his Pictoral Field-Book of the Revolution. He heard of the story of "Captain Molly" and erroneously identified her as the woman from the Battle of Monmouth, Mary Hays.

The Daughters of the American Revolution claimed to have located her grave in the hamlet of Swimtown, New York, just outside West Point, in 1926. The organization's New York chapter verified the records and reinterred her with full military honors at the West Point Cemetery. A monument was placed at her grave. In 2016, bones from her gravesite were recovered following the installation of a crypt. Forensic analysis showed that the bones did not belong to her but rather a middle-aged man who lived sometime between the colonial era and the 19th century.

A memorial commemorating Corbin's heroism was erected in 1909 near the scene of her service on the C. K. G. Billings estate in New York City's Fort Tryon Park. "Margaret Corbin Circle" lies just outside the main entrance to the park, and "Margaret Corbin Drive" connects the circle through the park to the Henry Hudson Parkway. The Chamber of Commerce of Washington Heights placed a plaque in her honor in 1982 at the start of Margaret Corbin Drive. According to the New York Historical Association, Corbin was "honored as no woman of the revolution has ever been honored before".

In June 2021, the Manhattan Campus of the New York Harbor Health Care System of the Department of Veterans Affairs was renamed the Margaret Cochran Corbin Campus, located on East 23rd Street in the Kips Bay section of Manhattan. It was the first such facility in the United States to be named after a female veteran.
