= Cadet Monument (West Point) =

Monument at the US Military Academy Cemetery

- United States
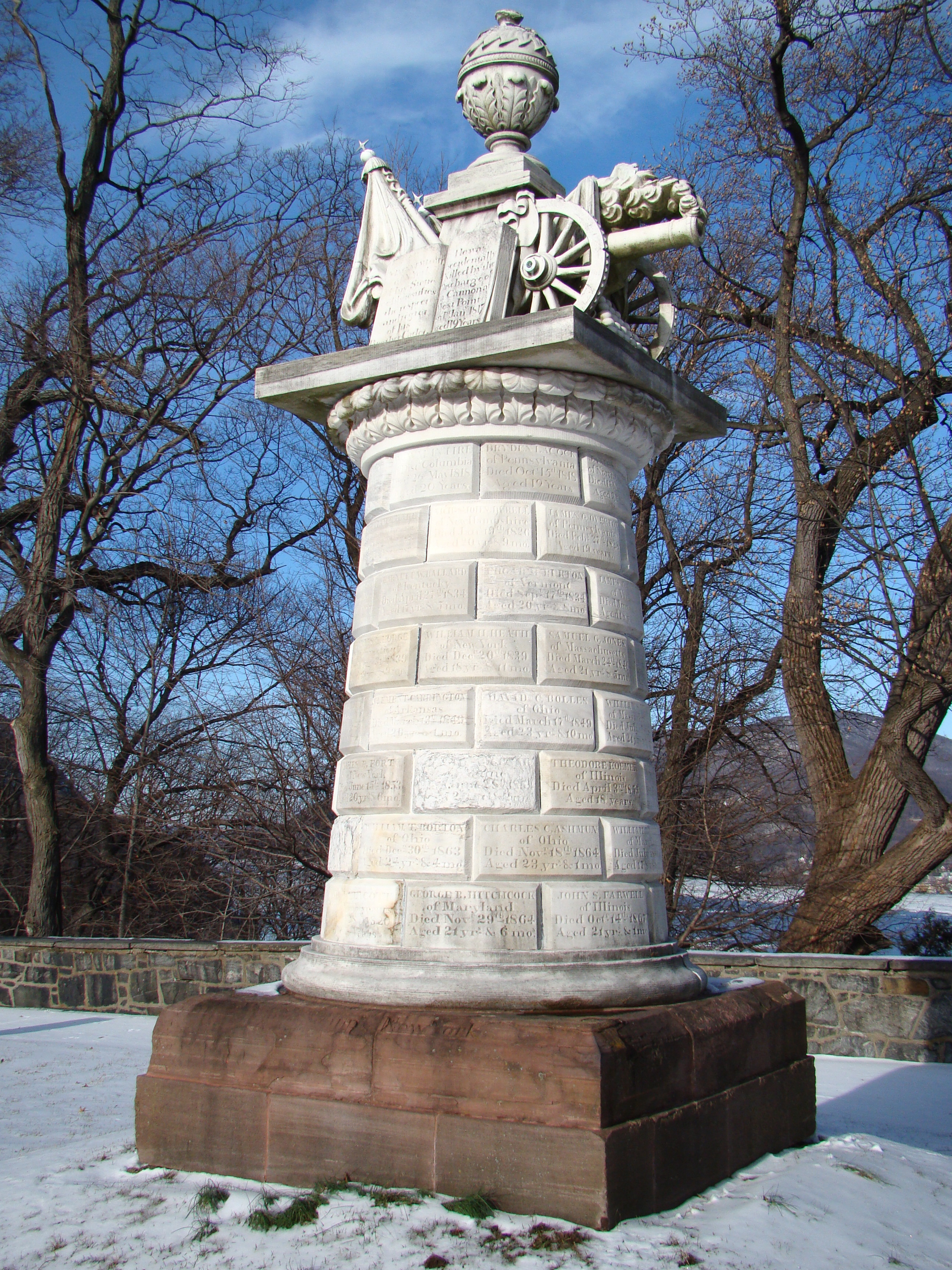
- Cadet monument in the old section of the West Point Cemetery
- For Cadet Vincent M. Lowe
- Unveiled: 1818
- Location: 41°24′0.2946″N 73°57′56.5092″W near Highland Falls, New York

The Cadet Monument is a monument at the United States Military Academy Cemetery, originally dedicated in honor of cadet Vincent M. Lowe, who died as a result of a premature cannon discharge in 1817. The names of cadets and professors who died while at the academy during its earliest days are inscribed upon the monument. The monument is located in the far northeastern corner of the cemetery.
