= Martin Maher (soldier) =

US Army noncommissioned officer (1876–1961)

- Born: June 25, 1876
- Died: January 17, 1961 (aged 84); New York City, NY
- Burial place: West Point Cemetery
- Military career
- Allegiance: United States
- Branch: United States Army
- Service years: 1898–1928
- Rank: Master sergeant
- Nickname: Marty
- Unit: United States Military Academy

Martin "Marty" Maher, Jr. (June 25, 1876 – January 17, 1961) was an Irish immigrant from Ballycrine near Roscrea, County Tipperary, Ireland, who joined the United States Army in 1898 and rose to the rank of master sergeant. He served as a swimming instructor at the United States Military Academy, West Point, New York, from 1899 to 1928.

Maher retired from the army in 1928 and stayed at West Point as a civilian employee in the athletic department. He retired from the civil service in 1946, completing 50 years of service at West Point (including two years as a waiter before his enlistment).

A much-respected and admired member of the West Point staff, Maher was named an honorary member of the classes of 1912, 1926, and 1928. His autobiography Bringing Up the Brass: My 55 Years at West Point, co-written by Colonel Russell Reeder and Nardi Reeder Campion, and with a foreword by Dwight D. Eisenhower, was published in 1951 by the David McKay Company.

Maher died on January 17, 1961, at the age of 84 and is interred in the West Point Cemetery.

== In popular culture ==
Maher was the subject of the 1955 film The Long Gray Line, starring Tyrone Power and Maureen O'Hara. His autobiography was the source material for the film. The film depicts Maher as having been in the U.S. Army for all of his 50 years at West Point; in reality, he was in the Army for 30 years and stayed on for another 20 after retiring.
