= Bronze Star Medal =

United States Armed Forces decoration award

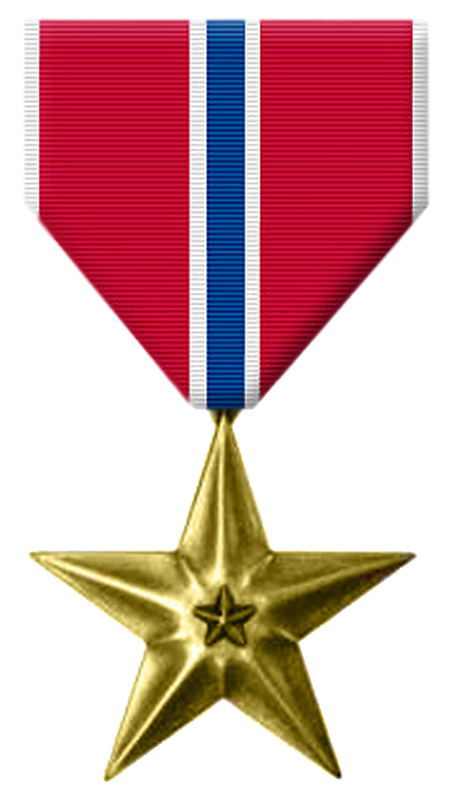
- Front view
- Type: Military medal
- Awarded for: "Heroic or meritorious achievement or service"
- Presented by: Department of the Army; Department of the Navy; Department of the Air Force; Department of Homeland Security
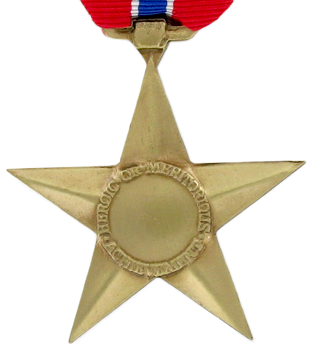
- Reverse
- Clasps: Army, Air Force, and Space Force – "V" device: Navy, Marine Corps, and Coast Guard – Combat "V"
- Status: Currently awarded
- Established: Executive Order 9419, 4 February 1944 (superseded by E.O. 11046, 24 August 1962)
- First award: 4 February 1944 (retroactive through 7 December 1941)
- Final award: Currently awarded
- Service ribbon

Precedence
- Next (higher): Army: Soldier's Medal; Naval Service: Navy and Marine Corps Medal; Air and Space Forces: Airman's Medal; Coast Guard: Coast Guard Medal
- Next (lower): Purple Heart

The Bronze Star Medal (BSM) is a United States Armed Forces decoration awarded to members of the United States Armed Forces for either heroic achievement, heroic service, meritorious achievement, or meritorious service in a combat zone.

When the medal is awarded by the Army, Air Force, or Space Force for acts of valor in combat, the "V" device is authorized for wear on the medal's ribbon. Similarly, when the medal is awarded by the Navy, Marine Corps, or Coast Guard for acts of valor or meritorious service in combat, the Combat "V" is authorized for wear on the medal's ribbon.

Officers from the other Uniformed Services of the United States are eligible to receive this award, as are foreign soldiers who have served with or alongside a service branch of the United States Armed Forces.

Civilians serving with U.S. military forces in combat are also eligible for the award. For example, UPI reporter Joe Galloway was awarded the Bronze Star with "V" device for actions during the Vietnam War, specifically rescuing a badly wounded soldier under fire in the Battle of Ia Drang Valley, in 1965. Another civilian recipient was writer Ernest Hemingway.

== General information ==
The Bronze Star Medal was established by Executive Order 9419, 4 February 1944 (superseded by Executive Order 11046, 24 August 1962, as amended by Executive Order 13286, 28 February 2003). The Bronze Star Medal may be awarded by the Secretary of a military department or the Secretary of Homeland Security with regard to the Coast Guard when not operating as a service in the Department of the Navy, or by such military commanders, or other appropriate officers as the Secretary concerned may designate, to any person who, while serving in any capacity in or with the Army, Navy, Marine Corps, Air Force, Coast Guard, or Space Force of the United States, after 6 December 1941, distinguishes, or has distinguished, herself or himself by heroic or meritorious achievement or service, not involving participation in aerial flight—

(a) while engaged in an action against an enemy of the United States;
(b) while engaged in military operations involving conflict with an opposing foreign force; or
(c) while serving with friendly foreign forces engaged in an armed conflict against an opposing armed force in which the United States is not a belligerent party.

The acts of heroism are of a lesser degree than required for the award of the Silver Star. The acts of merit or acts of valor must be less than that required for the Legion of Merit but must nevertheless have been meritorious and accomplished with distinction.

The Bronze Star Medal (without the "V" device) may be awarded to each member of the Armed Forces of the United States who, after 6 December 1941, was cited in orders or awarded a certificate for exemplary conduct in ground combat against an armed enemy between 7 December 1941 and 2 September 1945. For this purpose, the US Army's Combat Infantryman Badge or Combat Medical Badge award is considered as a citation in orders. Documents executed since 4 August 1944 in connection with recommendations for the award of decorations of higher degree than the Bronze Star Medal cannot be used as the basis for an award under this paragraph.

Effective 11 September 2001, the Meritorious Service Medal may also be bestowed in lieu of the Bronze Star Medal (without Combat "V" device) for meritorious achievement in a designated combat theater.

== Appearance ==
The Bronze Star Medal was designed by Rudolf Freund (1878–1960) of the jewelry firm Bailey, Banks & Biddle. (Freund also designed the Silver Star.)

The medal is a bronze star 1 1/2 inches (38 mm) in circumscribing diameter. In the center is a 3/16 inch (4.8 mm) diameter superimposed bronze star, the center line of all rays of both stars coinciding. The reverse bears the inscription "HEROIC OR MERITORIOUS ACHIEVEMENT" with a space for the name of the recipient to be engraved. The star hangs from its ribbon by a rectangular metal loop with rounded corners. The suspension ribbon is 1 3/8 inches (35 mm) wide and consists of the following stripes: 1/32 inch (0.79 mm) white 67101; 9/16 inch (14 mm) scarlet 67111; 1/32 inch (0.79 mm) white; center stripe 1/8 inch (3.2 mm) ultramarine blue 67118; 1/32 inch (0.79 mm) white; 9/16 inch (14 mm) scarlet; and 1/32 inch (0.79 mm) white.

== Authorized devices ==
The Bronze Star Medal with the "V" device to denote heroism is the fourth highest military decoration for valor. Although a service member may be cited for heroism in combat and be awarded more than one Bronze Star authorizing the "V" device, only one "V" may be worn on each suspension and service ribbon of the medal. The following ribbon devices must be specifically authorized in the award citation in order to be worn on the Bronze Star Medal, the criteria for and wear of the devices vary between the services:

- Oak leaf cluster – In the Army, Air Force, and Space Force, the oak leaf cluster is worn to denote additional awards.
- ^{5}/_{16} inch star – In the Navy, Marine Corps, and Coast Guard, the ^{5}/_{16} inch star is worn to denote additional awards.
- "V" device – In the Army, the "V" is worn solely to denote "participation in acts of heroism involving conflict with an armed enemy."; in the Air Force and Space Force, the "V" is worn to denote heroism in combat.
- Combat "V" – In the Navy, Marine Corps, and Coast Guard, the "V" is worn to denote combat heroism or to recognize individuals who are "exposed to personal hazard during direct participation in combat operations".

== History ==
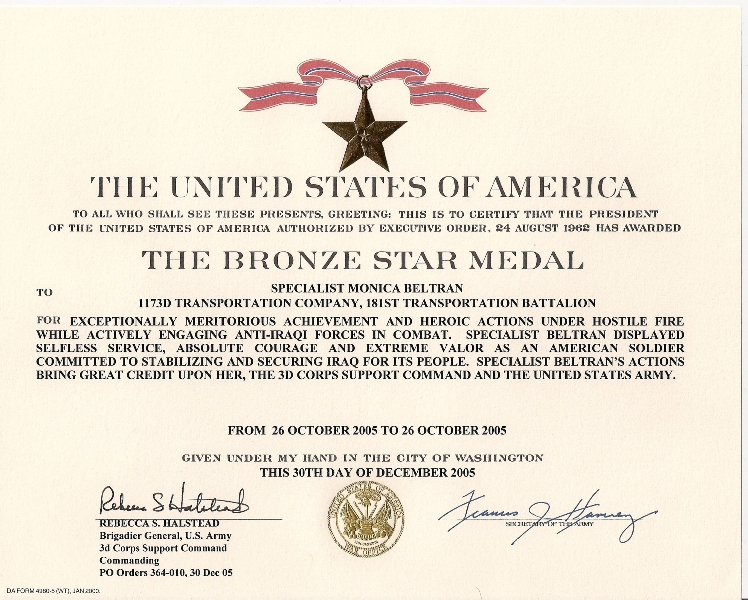
An example of an army Bronze Star Medal citation, given for combat valor.

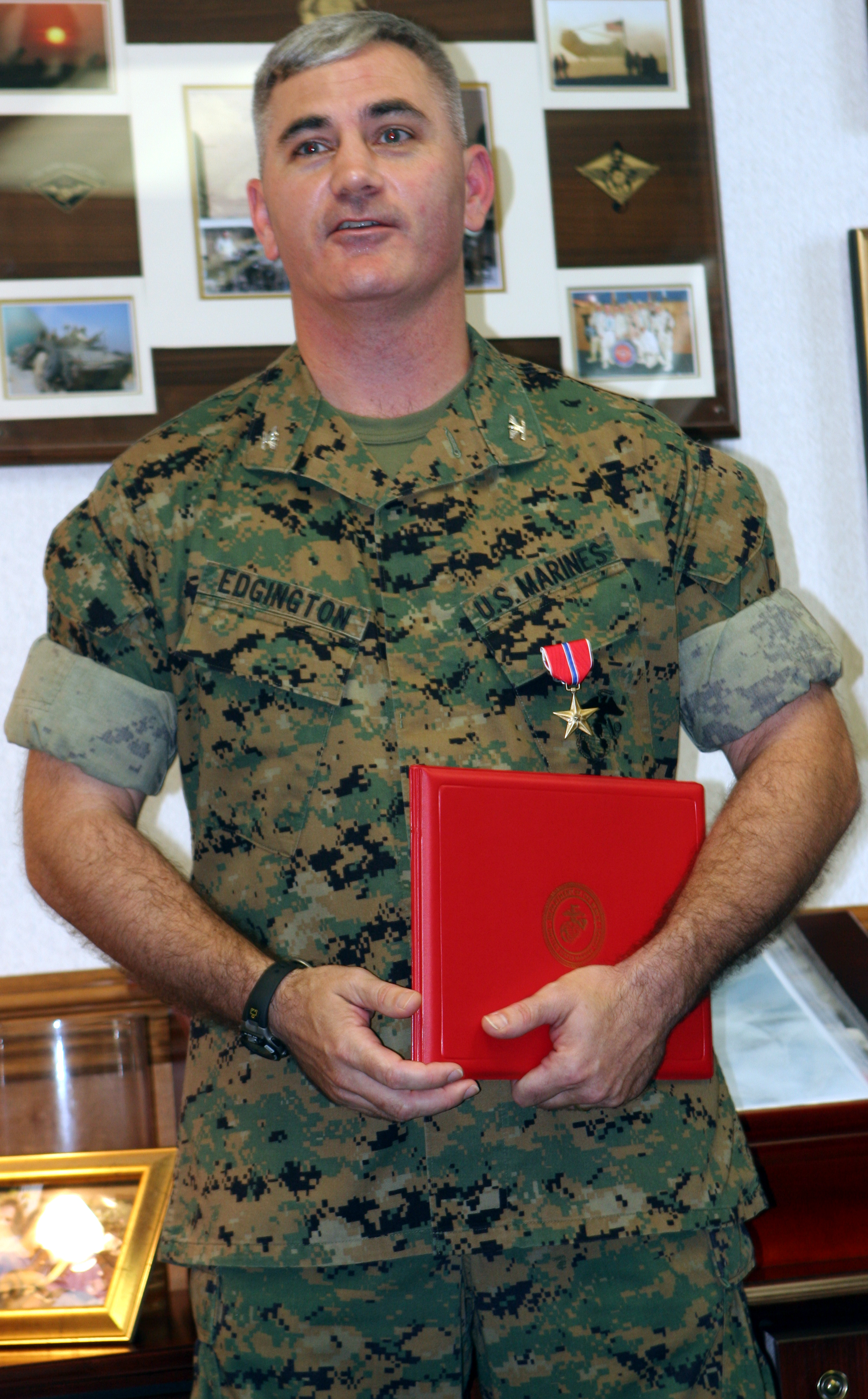
Marine Col. Richard E. Edgington after being awarded a Bronze Star

Colonel Russell P. "Red" Reeder conceived the idea of the Bronze Star Medal in 1943; he believed it would aid morale if captains of companies or of batteries could award a medal to deserving people serving under them. Reeder felt another medal was needed as a ground equivalent of the Air Medal, and suggested calling the proposed new award the "Ground Medal". The idea eventually rose through the military bureaucracy and gained supporters. General George C. Marshall, in a memorandum to President Franklin D. Roosevelt dated 3 February 1944, wrote

The fact that the ground troops, Infantry in particular, lead miserable lives of extreme discomfort and are the ones who must close in personal combat with the enemy, makes the maintenance of their morale of great importance. The award of the Air Medal has had an adverse reaction on the ground troops, particularly the Infantry Riflemen who are now suffering the heaviest losses, air or ground, in the Army, and enduring the greatest hardships.

The Air Medal had been adopted two years earlier to raise airmen's morale. President Roosevelt authorized the Bronze Star Medal by Executive Order 9419 dated 4 February 1944, retroactive to 7 December 1941. This authorization was announced in War Department Bulletin No. 3, dated 10 February 1944.

President John F. Kennedy amended Executive Order 9419 per Executive Order 11046 dated 24 August 1962 to expand the authorization to include those serving with friendly forces. This allowed for awards where US service members become involved in an armed conflict where the United States was not a belligerent. At the time of the Executive Order, for example, the US was not a belligerent in Vietnam, so US advisers serving with the Republic of Vietnam Armed Forces would not have been eligible for the award.

Since the award criteria state that the Bronze Star Medal may be awarded to "any person ... while serving in any capacity in or with" the US Armed Forces, awards to members of foreign armed services serving with the United States are permitted. Thus, a number of Allied soldiers received the Bronze Star Medal in World War II, as well as UN soldiers in the Korean War, Vietnamese and allied forces in the Vietnam War, and coalition forces in recent military operations such as the Persian Gulf War, War in Afghanistan, and the Iraq War. A number of Bronze Star Medals with the "V" device were awarded to veterans of the Battle of Mogadishu.

=== World War II infantry award ===
As a result of a study conducted in 1947, a policy was implemented that authorized the retroactive award of the Bronze Star Medal (without the "V" device) to all soldiers who had received the Combat Infantryman Badge or the Combat Medical Badge during World War II. The basis for this decision was that these badges were awarded only to soldiers who had borne the hardships which resulted in General Marshall's support of the establishment of the Bronze Star Medal. Both badges required a recommendation by the commander and a citation in orders.

=== U.S. Air Force criteria controversy ===
In 2012, two U.S. airmen were allegedly subjected to cyber-bullying after receiving Bronze Star Medals for meritorious non-combat service. The two airmen, who had received the medals in March 2012, had been finance NCOICs in medical units deployed to the War in Afghanistan. The awards sparked a debate as to whether or not the Air Force was awarding too many medals to its members, and whether the Bronze Star should be awarded for non-combat service. This prompted the Air Force to take down stories of the two posted to the internet, and to clarify its criteria for awarding medals. The Air Force contended that meritorious service awards of the Bronze Star outnumber valor awards, and that it views awards on a case-by-case basis to maintain the integrity of the award.

This is not the first time that the USAF has been criticized for offering this award. The Department of Defense investigated the award of the Bronze Star Medal (BSM) by the USAF to some 246 individuals after operations in Kosovo in 1999. All but 60 were awarded to officers, and only 16 of those awarded were actually in the combat zone. At least five were awarded to officers who never left Whiteman Air Force Base in Missouri. During this campaign, the Navy had awarded 69 BSMs, and the Army with 5,000 troops in neighboring Albania (considered part of the combat zone) awarded none. In the end, there was a Pentagon review and decision by Congress in 2001 to stop the awarding of Bronze Stars to personnel outside the combat zone.
