= Margaret Corbin Monument =

American war monument from 1926

Coordinates: 41°23′52.35″N 73°58′2.6″W

Margaret "Molly" Corbin Monument
- United States
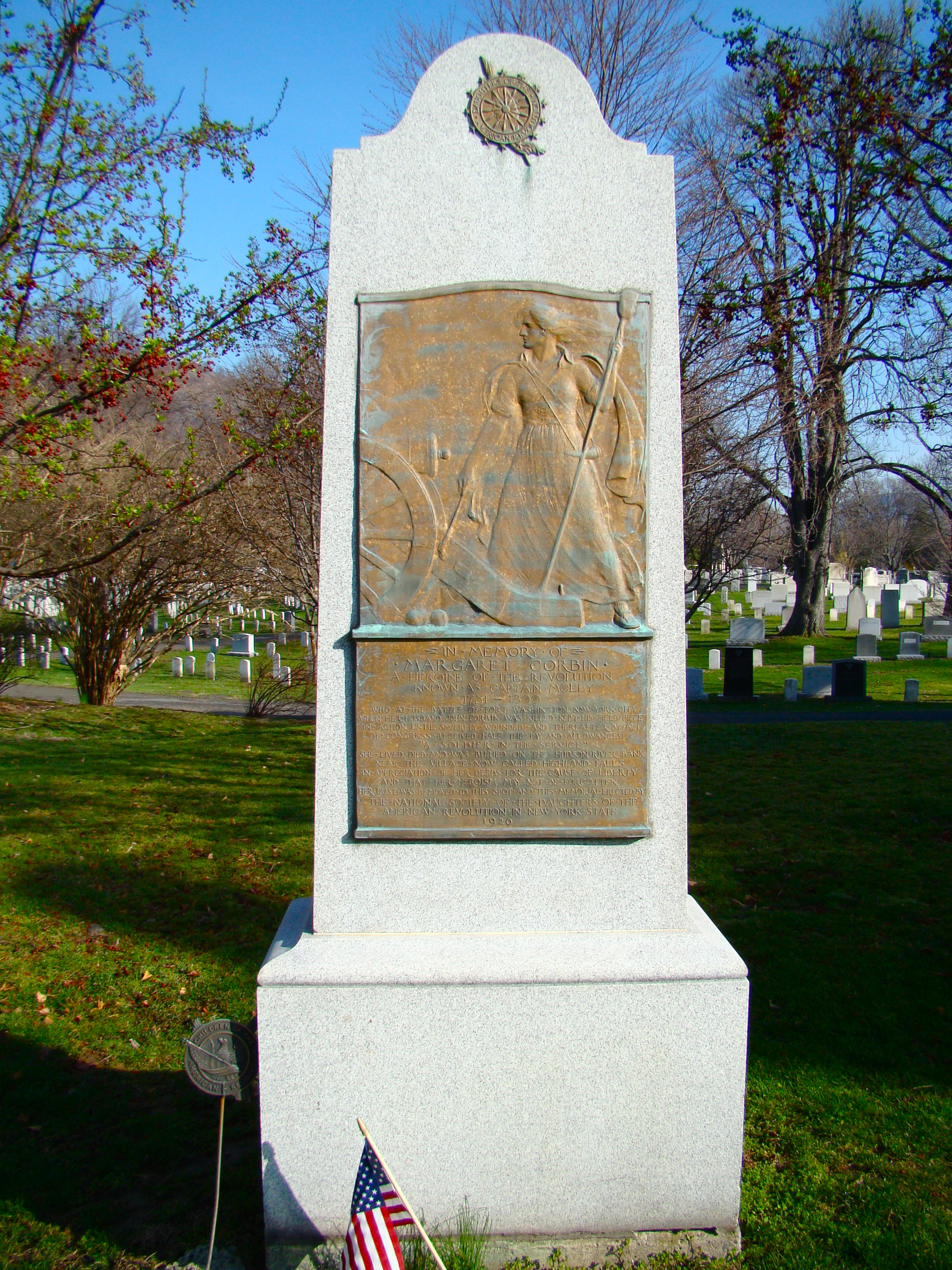
- Margaret Corbin Monument
- For Margaret Corbin
- Unveiled: 1926
- Location: near Highland Falls, New York

Burials by war
- American Revolution

Margaret Corbin Monument is located in United States Military Academy Cemetery and honors Margaret Corbin (November 12, 1751 – January 16, 1800), a heroine of the American Revolution. She died in Highland Falls, New York and was buried near the Hudson River.

In 1926, remains believed to be hers were disinterred and reburied near the entrance to the West Point Cemetery by the Daughters of the American Revolution. However, a 2017 study revealed that these were instead the remains of an unknown man; the actual location of Corbin's remains is unknown.

== Other memorials ==
There is a memorial dedicated to Corbin on Margaret Corbin Drive in Fort Tryon Park in Manhattan, New York City, near the location of the Battle of Fort Washington. Margaret Corbin Circle also lies just outside the entrance to the park.

== Gallery ==
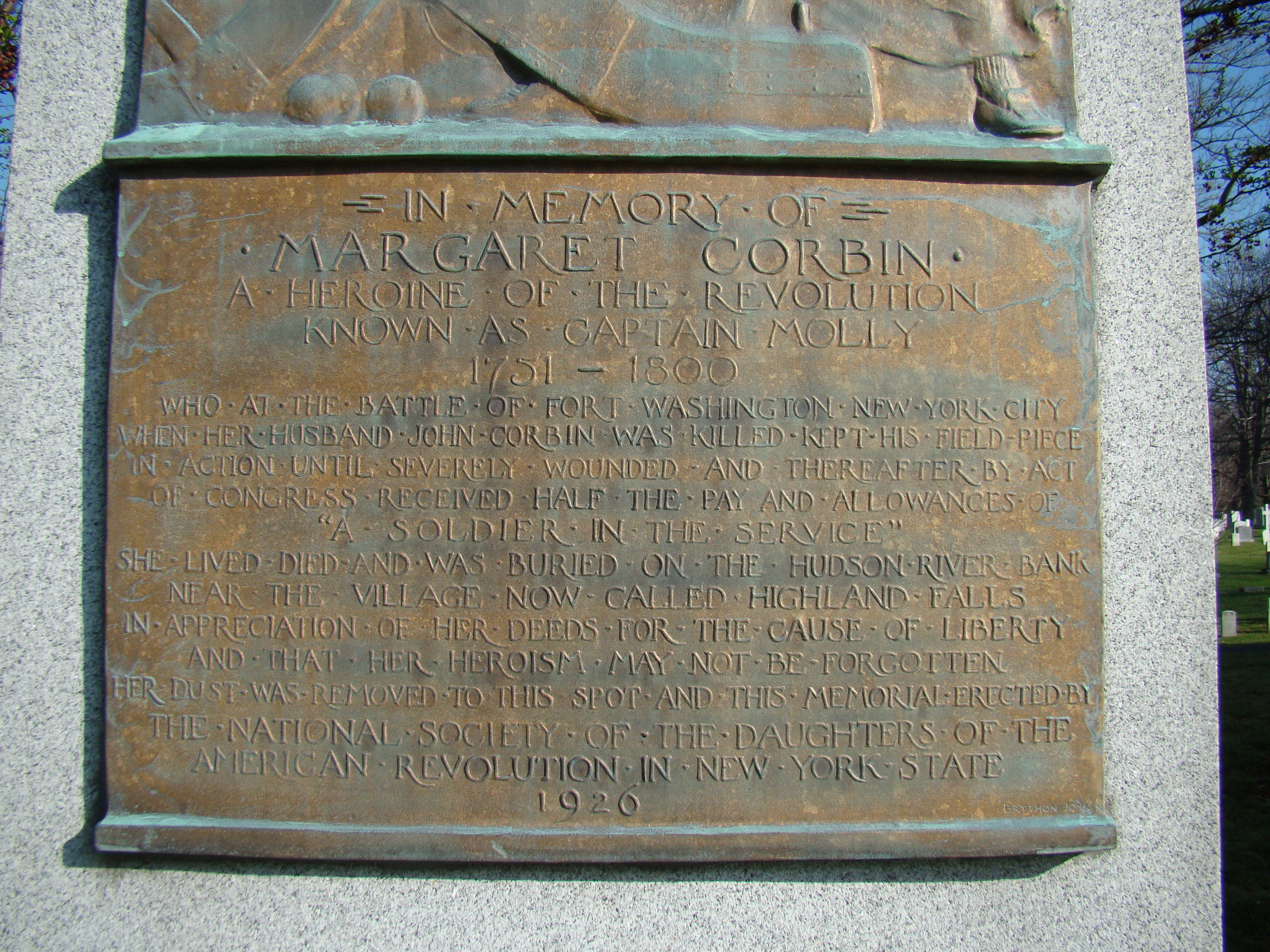
Base of Corbin's memorial gravestone

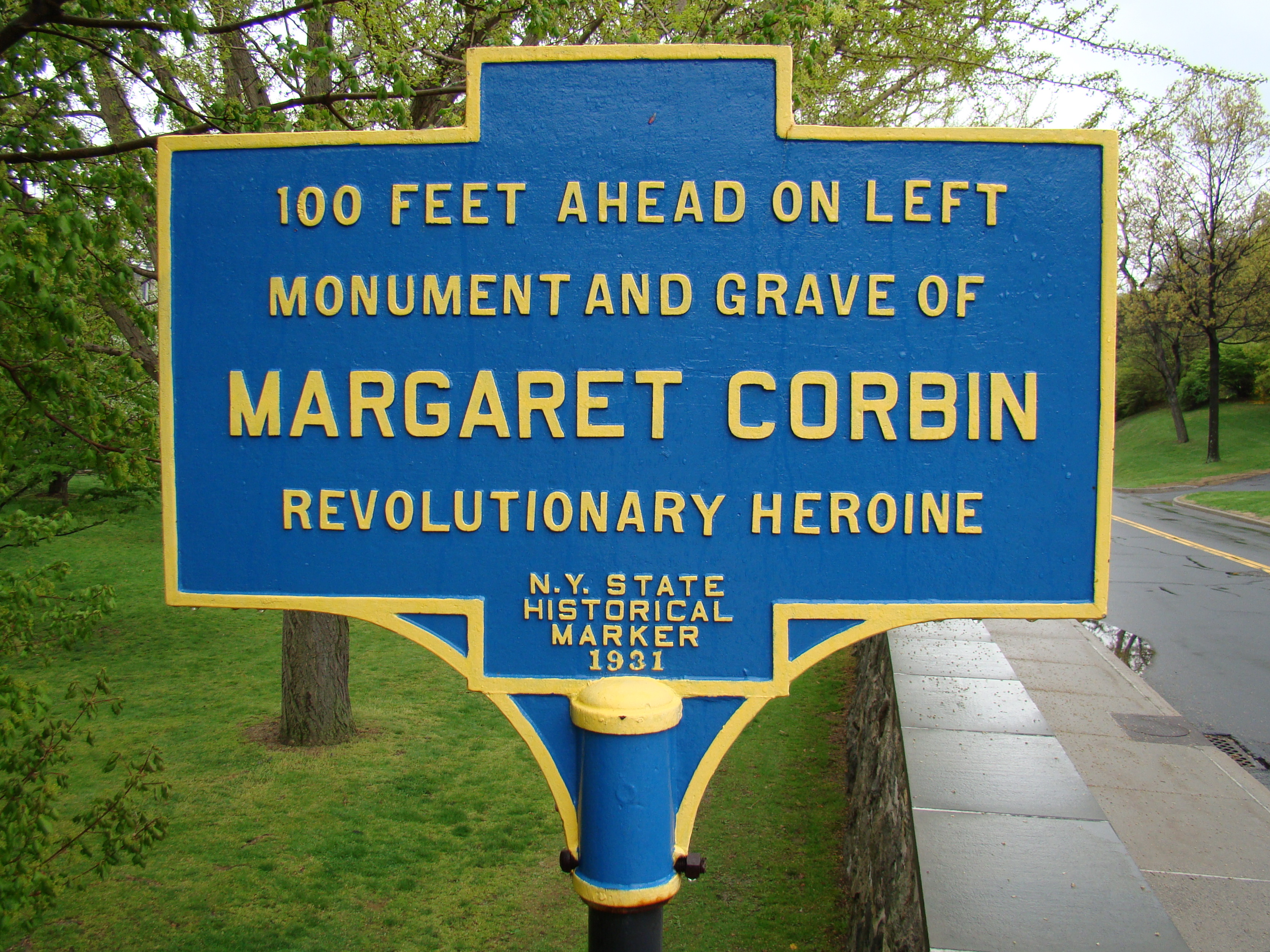
Roadside marker on Washington Road, West Point

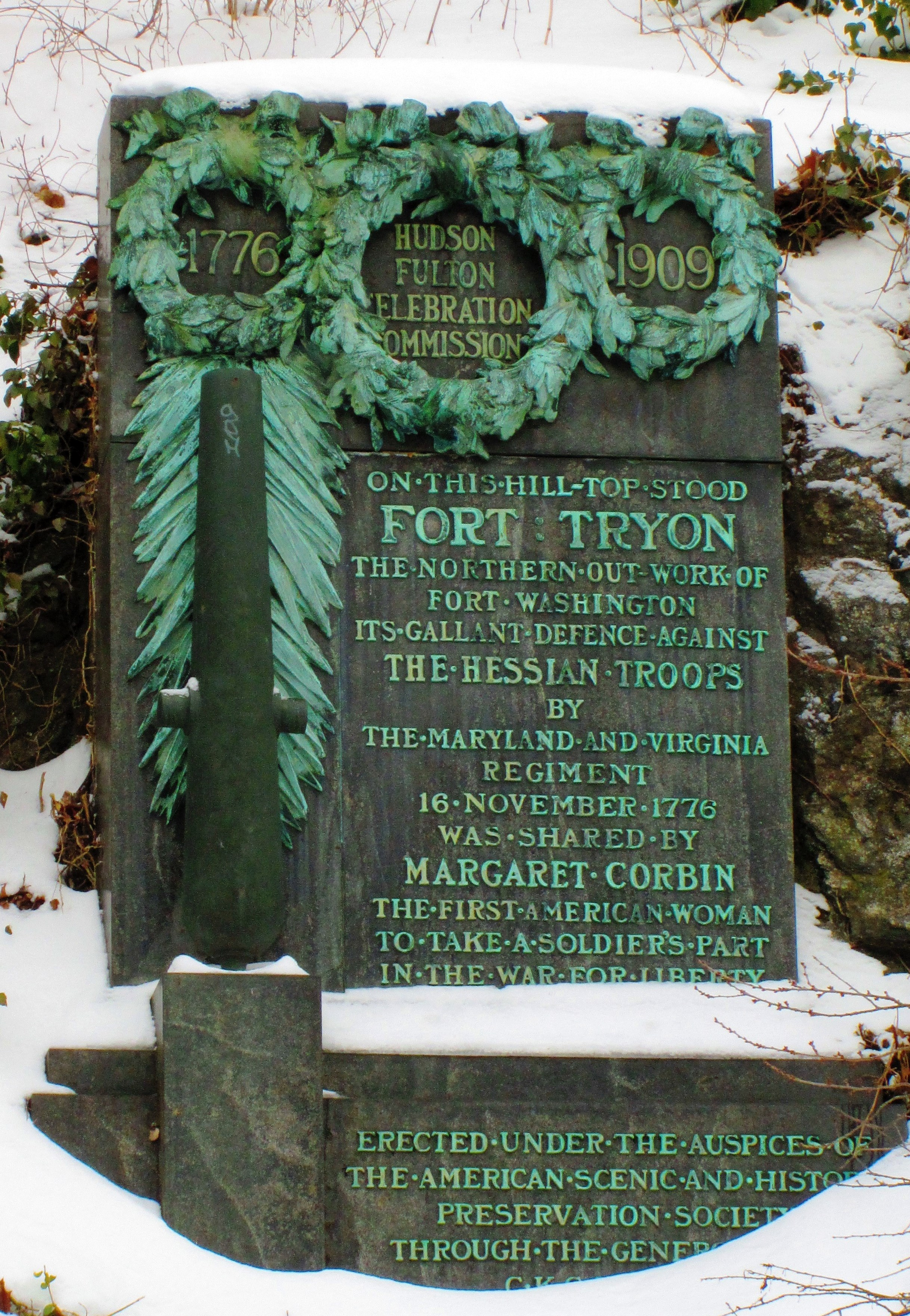
The memorial to Corbin in Fort Tryon Park in Manhattan

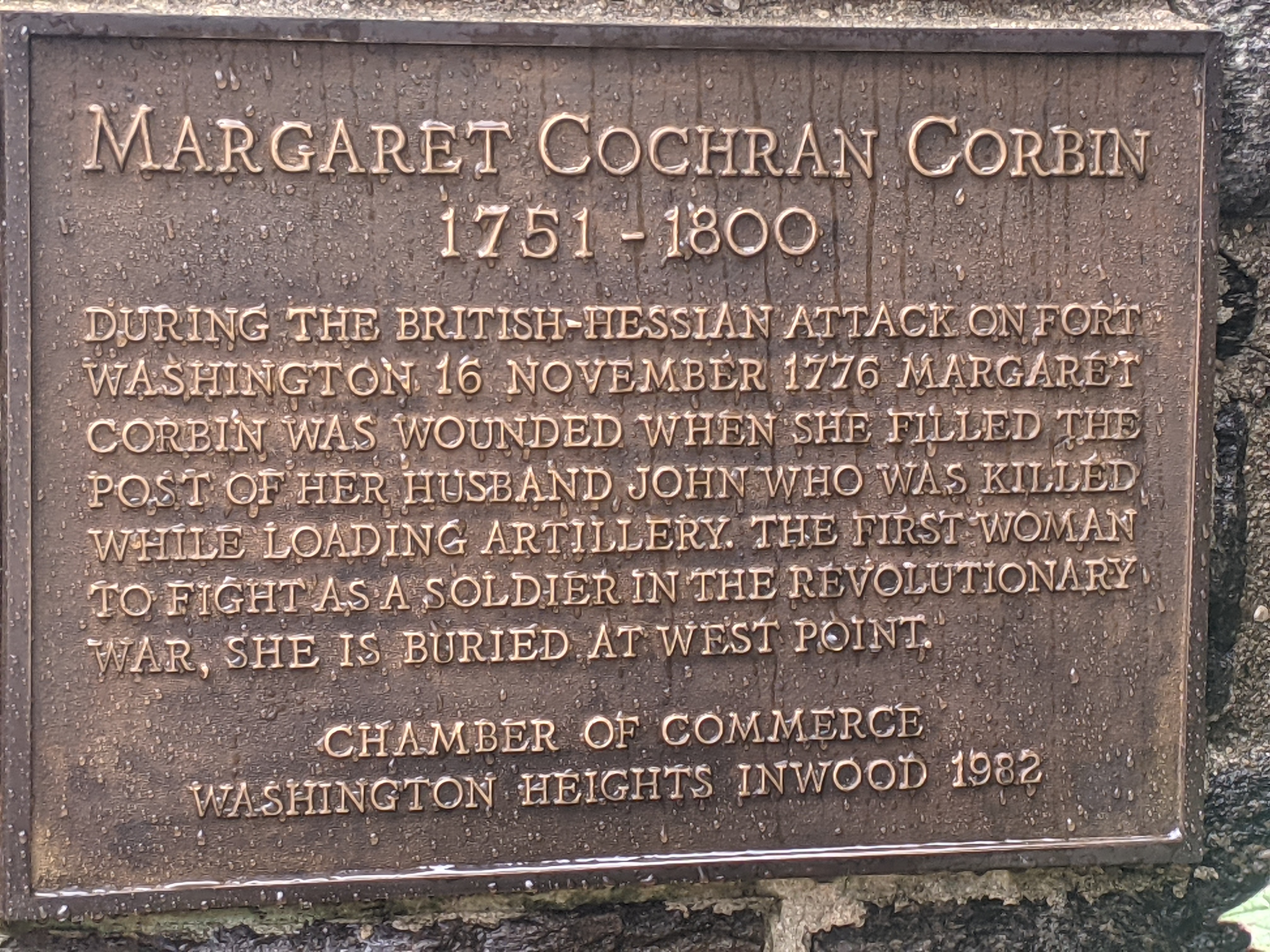
Margaret Corbin plaque on Margaret Corbin Drive in Fort Tryon Park
