= Eleazer D. Wood =

American Army officer (1783–1814)

Eleazer Derby Wood (December 1783 – September 17, 1814) was a Colonel and American Army officer in the War of 1812. Fort Wood, which became the base of the Statue of Liberty, was named in his honor. Wood was described in Cullum's Register of West Point graduates as "all accounts, an outstandingly brave man and competent soldier."

== Early career ==
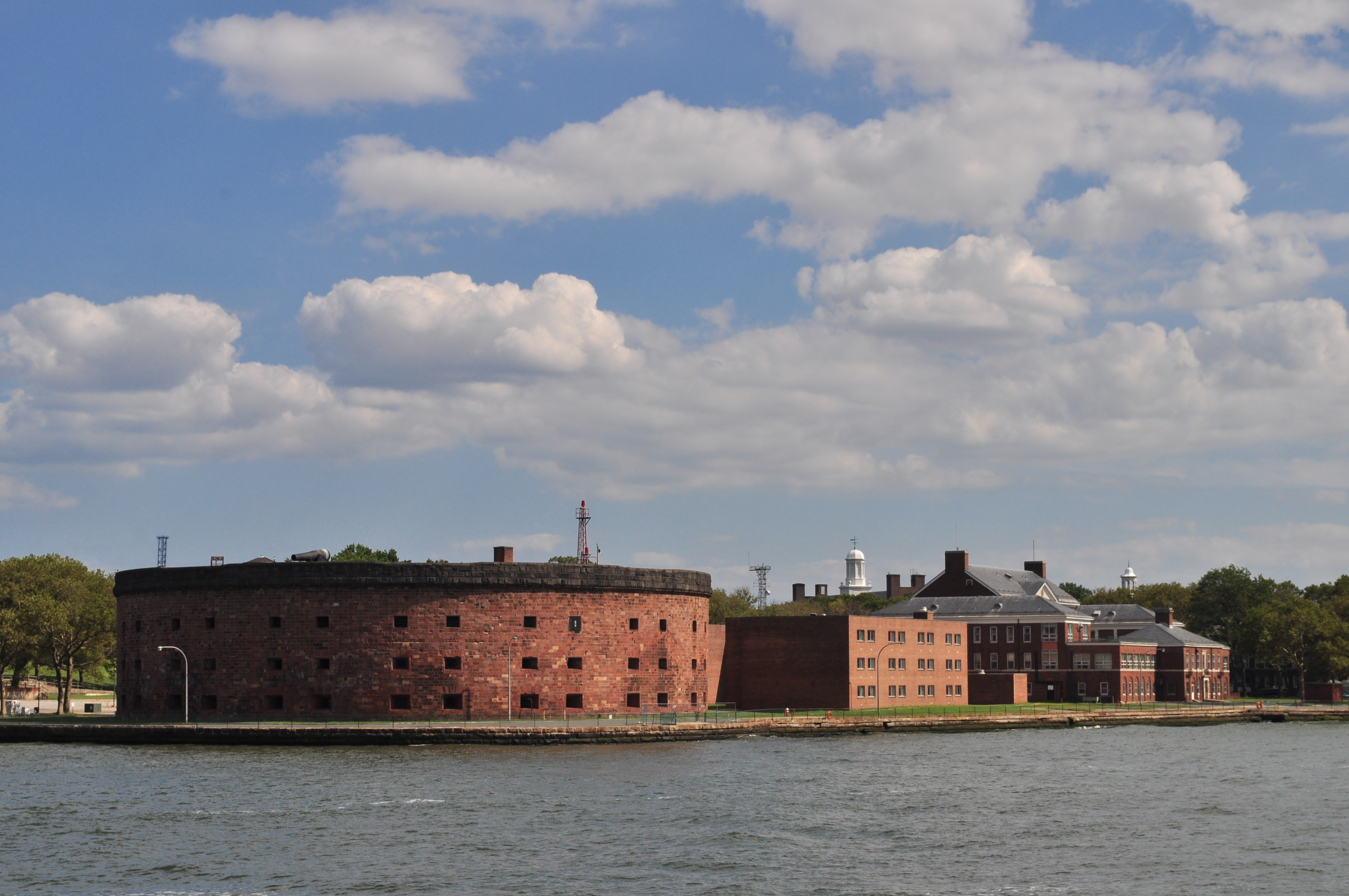
Castle Williams, Governors Island

Wood was born in Lunenburg, Massachusetts. He was admitted to United States Military Academy at West Point on May 17, 1805 and graduated on October 30, 1806.

After graduation he served as assistant Engineer in the construction of the defenses at Governor's Island in New York harbor, 1807. In February 1808 he was promoted to First Lieutenant. He assisted in the construction of Castle Williams in New York Harbor and Fort Norfolk in Virginia.

== War of 1812 ==
Shortly after the start of the War of 1812, Wood was promoted to captain on July 1, 1812.

He conducted the defence of Fort Meigs during its siege, was engaged in the sortie of May 5, 1813, for which he received a brevet (honorary promotion) to major. He was in command of the artillery at the battle of the Thames on October 5 of the same year. He was appointed acting adjutant-general to General William Henry Harrison in October 1813 and was transferred to the northern army in 1814.

Wood was engaged in all the battles of that northern campaign, including the capture of Fort Erie on July 3. Wood was also in the battles of Chippawa and Niagara Falls, and was brevetted Lieutenant Colonel for bravery at the last-named action.

After the battle of Niagara, the American army fell back to Fort Erie where Colonel Wood, then in command of the 21st Infantry Regiment, participated in the defense the fort on August 15, 1814. Colonel Wood died of wounds he received while leading a sortie from Fort Erie on September 17, 1814.

Colonel Wood's burial location is unknown. While there is a monument to him in the West Point Cemetery, there is no evidence he is buried there.

== Legacy ==
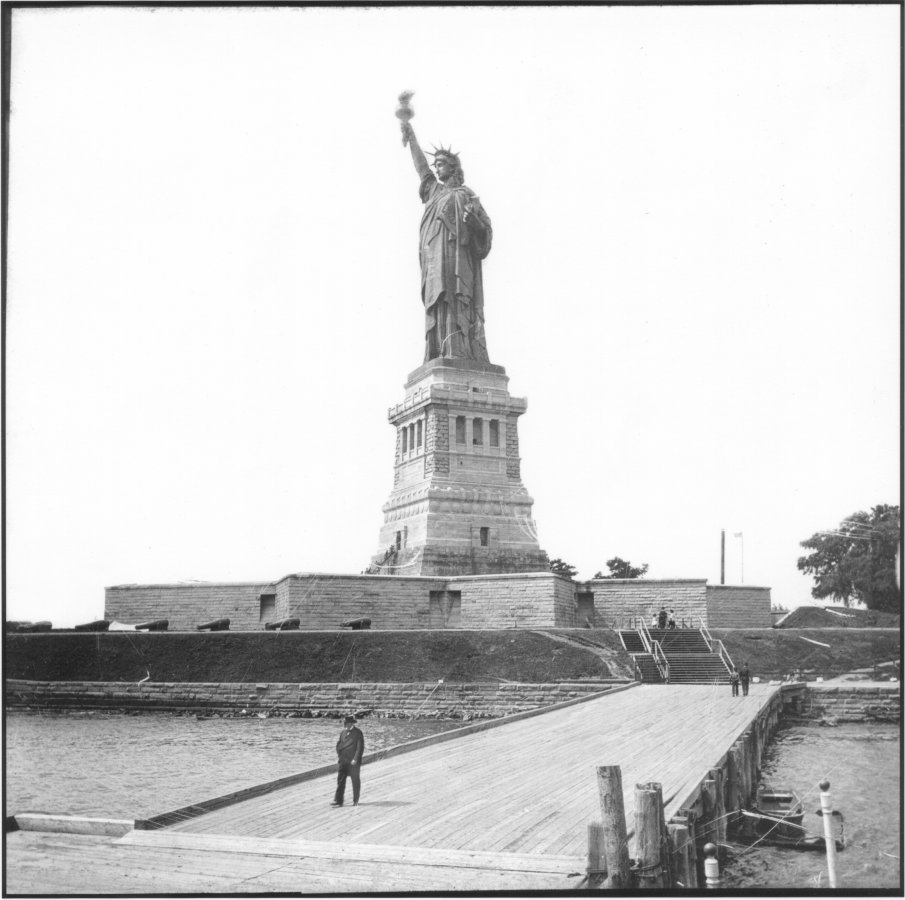
Fort Wood's star-shaped walls became the base of the Statue of Liberty

Wood was greatly admired by Major General Jacob Brown, who was Wood's commander at the time of his death and later the commanding general of the U.S. Army. Brown commissioned a monument in Wood's honor at West Point. Brown also had Fort Wood on Bedloe's Island in New York Harbor, on which the Statue of Liberty was later built, named after Wood. He is also the namesake of Wood County, Ohio.

Wood's Monument at West Point was originally located near the parade field but was moved to the post cemetery in 1885.

Wood was one of the first graduates of West Point to be killed in action. (The first was Ensign George Ronan, who was killed near Fort Dearborn in Chicago, Illinois on August 15, 1812.)

== Dates of rank ==
- Cadet, USMA - May 17, 1805
- 2nd Lieutenant, Corps of Engineers - October 30, 1806
- 1st Lieutenant, Corps of Engineers - February, 1808
- Captain, Corps of Engineers - July 1, 1812
- Brevet Major - May 6, 1813
- Brevet Lieutenant Colonel - July 25, 1814
