= The Long Gray Line =

1955 film by John Ford

- Theatrical release poster
- Directed by: John Ford
- Screenplay by: Edward Hope
- Based on: Bringing Up the Brass by Martin Maher and Nardi Reeder Campion
- Produced by: Robert Arthur
- Starring: Tyrone Power; Maureen O'Hara
- Narrated by: Tyrone Power
- Cinematography: Charles Lawton Jr.
- Edited by: William A. Lyon
- Music by: George Duning
- Color process: Technicolor
- Production company: Rota Productions
- Distributed by: Columbia Pictures
- Release date: February 10, 1955 (New York City)
- Running time: 137 minutes
- Country: United States
- Language: English
- Budget: $1,748,000 (estimated)
- Box office: $4.1 million (US)

The Long Gray Line is a 1955 American Technicolor biographical comedy-drama film in CinemaScope directed by John Ford based on the life of Marty Maher and his autobiography, Bringing Up the Brass, co-written with Nardi Reeder Campion. Tyrone Power stars as the scrappy Irish immigrant whose 50-year career at West Point took him from a dishwasher to a non-commissioned officer and athletic instructor.

Maureen O'Hara, one of Ford's favorite leading ladies, plays Maher's wife and fellow immigrant, Mary O'Donnell. The film co-stars Ward Bond as Herman Koehler, the Master of the Sword (athletic director) and Army's head football coach (1897–1900), who first befriends Maher. Milburn Stone appears as John J. Pershing, who in 1898 swears Maher into the Army. Harry Carey Jr. makes a brief appearance as the young cadet Dwight D. Eisenhower. (Eisenhower wrote the foreword to Bringing Up the Brass.) Philip Carey plays (fictional) Army football player and future general Chuck Dotson. In addition, actress Betsy Palmer makes her screen debut as Kitty Carter.

The phrase "The Long Gray Line" is used to describe, as a continuum, all graduates and cadets of the United States Military Academy at West Point, New York. Many of the scenes in the film were shot on location at West Point, including the so-called "million dollar view" of the Hudson River near the parade grounds. The film was the last one in which actor Robert Francis appeared before his death at age 25 in an air crash. His rising stardom had reached third billing behind Power and O'Hara at the time of his death.

== Plot ==
Facing forced retirement, Master Sergeant Martin Maher goes to the White House to appeal to the commander in chief, West Point graduate, and 5-star general, President Dwight D. Eisenhower, who gives Marty a warm welcome and listens to his story.

Arriving from County Tipperary, Ireland, in 1898, Marty begins bussing tables. After two months he has nothing to show for it, because he is docked for every dish he breaks. When he learns that enlisted men only worry about the guardhouse, he enlists in the U.S. Army. Captain Koehler, Master of the Sword, is impressed with his fist-fighting and brings him on as an assistant in athletics instruction.

Marty meets Mrs. Koehler's cook, Mary O'Donnell, just arrived from Ireland. The Koehlers advise Mary not to engage in conversation with Marty until he re-enlists and proposes, for fear their two fiery Irish tempers will clash. They marry and settle into a house on campus. Marty becomes a corporal, and Mary saves enough money to bring his father and brother to America. Captain Koehler makes Marty a swimming instructor—after teaching him how to swim.

Mary gives birth to a boy. The cadets serenade Marty and give him a cadet saber for Martin Maher III, class of 1936. The doctor arrives with heartbreaking news. The newborn boy has died. While Mary sleeps, Marty gets drunk. The cadets go off limits to bring him home, and report themselves for doing so. In the morning Mary tells Marty she can never have another child.

The cadets become the sons the Mahers will never have. Over time, Marty earns the love and respect of men such as Omar Bradley, James Van Fleet, George Patton, and Dwight D. Eisenhower (to whom he gives advice on slowing hair loss). Marty introduces cadet "Red" Sundstrom, who is struggling with math, to a post school teacher, Kitty Carter. She offers to tutor Red. They marry after graduation in 1917, and Red goes off to war with his classmates.

The casualty lists come in. Marty marks the losses in the yearbooks with a black ribbon marking the page of each former cadet who is killed in action. Peace comes, and while the campus erupts with joy, a grim-faced Marty places a ribbon on Red's page. Red has been awarded the Medal of Honor and an automatic appointment to the academy for his infant son.

Years later, James "Red" Sundstrom Jr. and his classmates are sworn in. Marty has guided three generations of cadets. On Sunday, December 7, 1941, the church service is interrupted by the news of Japanese raid on Pearl Harbor and the United States' likely entry into World War II, Red confesses to Marty that he was married over Thanksgiving weekend. The bride's parents had the marriage annulled, but it means expulsion for Red if it is discovered. Deeply disappointed, Marty is filled with pride when Sundstrom does the honorable thing by resigning and enlisting in the Army. Because of his training, he ships out immediately.

Mary wants to view one of the parades she so loves but is too weak. Marty helps her to the porch. She takes out her rosary and quietly dies while Marty is fetching her shawl and medicine.

Marty prepares for a quiet evening alone on Christmas Eve, 1944, but is joined by a group of cadets. He picks the all-time West Point football team while they fix his dinner. Kitty arrives with Red Jr., whose medals make the cadets whistle. He has earned his captain's bars in Europe and wants Marty to pin them on.

The president tells General Dotson to call "The Point" and find out what the SNAFU is. Marty gives an aide a bottle of hair restorer for the president. Dotson tells Marty he is AWOL and flies him back to the Point, where the superintendent and Dotson hustle him onto the crowded parade ground. Slightly bemused by the attention, Marty notices the first tune: Garryowen. “This is for you, Marty. The cadets asked for it", the superintendent says. The film concludes with a full dress parade in Marty's honor. All the people Marty loves, both living and dead, step up to honor him. The band plays Auld Lang Syne, which brings tears to Marty's eyes.

== Cast ==
- Tyrone Power as Martin Maher
- Maureen O'Hara as Mary O'Donnell
- Robert Francis as James N. Sundstrom Jr.
- Donald Crisp as Old Martin
- Ward Bond as Captain Herman Koehler
- Betsy Palmer as Kitty Carter
- Philip Carey as Charles "Chuck" Dotson (as Phil Carey)
- William Leslie as James Nilsson "Red" Sundstrom
- Harry Carey Jr. as Dwight D. Eisenhower
- Patrick Wayne as Abner "Cherub" Overton
- Sean McClory as Dinny Maher
- Peter Graves as Corporal Rudolph Heinz
- Milburn Stone as Captain John J. Pershing
- Erin O'Brien-Moore as Mrs. Koehler (as Erin O'Brien Moore)
- Walter D. Ehlers as Mike Shannon
- Willis Bouchey as Major Thomas

== Reception ==
Variety called The Long Gray Line "a standout drama on West Point". Bosley Crowther of The New York Times called the film sentimental but a rich and rousing tribute to West Point, and likens Power's Martin Maher to "Mr. Chips with a brogue."

On Rotten Tomatoes the film has a 90% rating based on 10 reviews.

== Inaccuracies ==
- Maher was not sworn in by U.S. Army Captain John J. Pershing. Pershing was a West Point instructor in 1897, but between 1898 and 1899 he was serving in Cuba and the Philippines.
- The representation of Maher's family at West Point is incorrect, even showing his over-aged father trying to enlist in the US Army in 1917. Although Maher's father did come to West Point, he had died in 1912. Maher had three brothers, not one, who also served in the U.S. Army: one private and two NCOs.
- Cadet Sundstrom was created for the film. The only historically real West Point graduate to be awarded the Medal of Honor during World War I was Emory Jenison Pike from the Class of 1901. He, like the fictional Sundstrom, received the award posthumously. However, it is factually correct that any child of a Medal of Honor recipient is eligible for an appointment to the United States Military Academy.
- Maher did not appeal to the sitting U.S. president (Dwight Eisenhower in the film) to stay with the U.S. Army beyond compulsory retirement age. Maher actually retired from the U.S. Army in 1928 after 30 years service. He then remained at West Point as a civilian employee until 1946.
- Maher's wife died in 1948, not earlier as shown in the film.
- Vicente Lim, who is shown graduating with the class of 1915, actually graduated in 1914.

== See also ==
- List of American films of 1955
- List of boxing films
