= Sniper rifle =

Type of rifle used for long-range engagements against enemy personnel

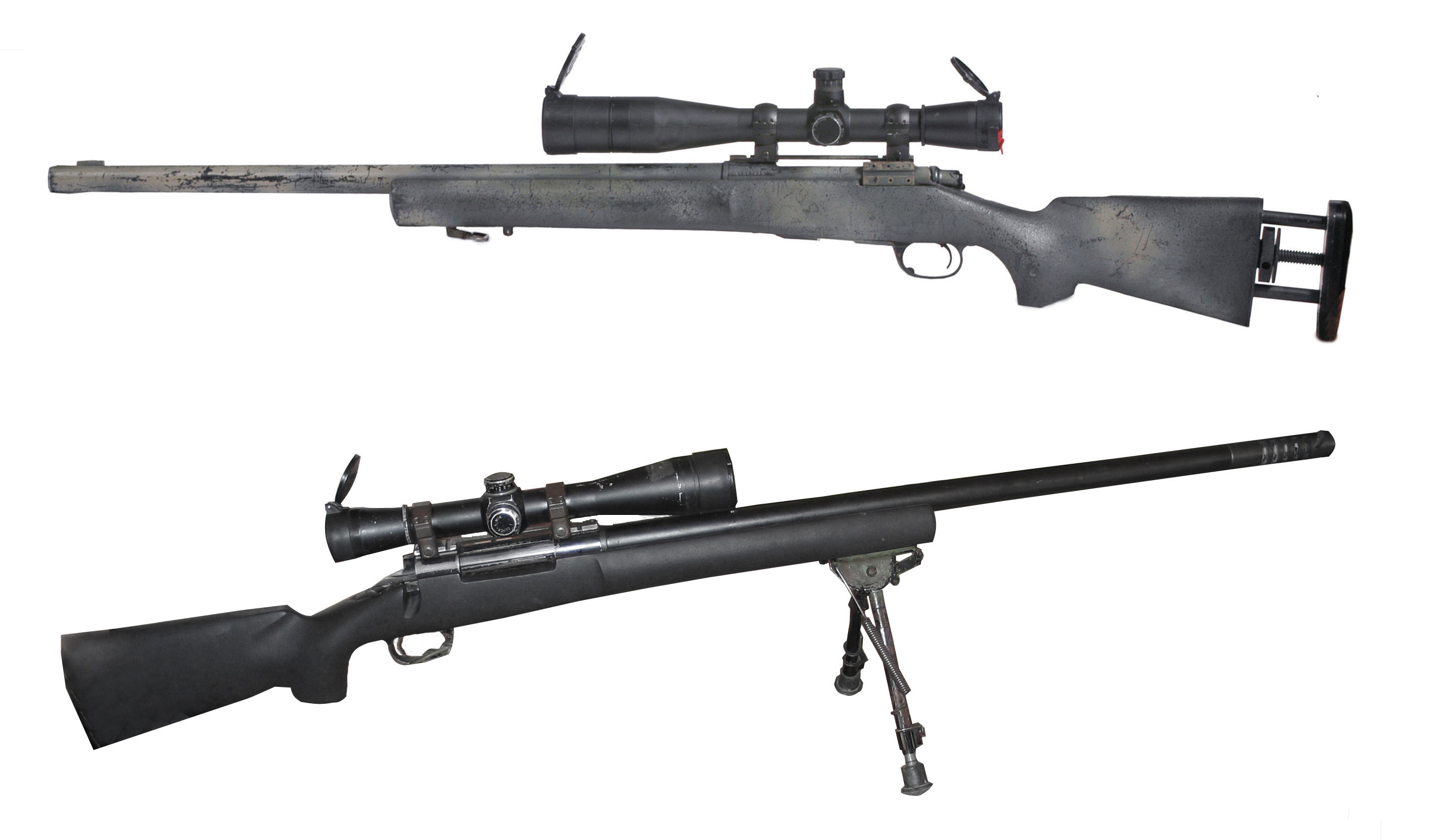
The bolt-action 7.62×51mm M24 Sniper Weapon System is capable of 0.5 MOA accuracy to maximal effective range of about 800 meters. The M24 was the United States Army standard-issue sniper rifle from 1988 to 2010.

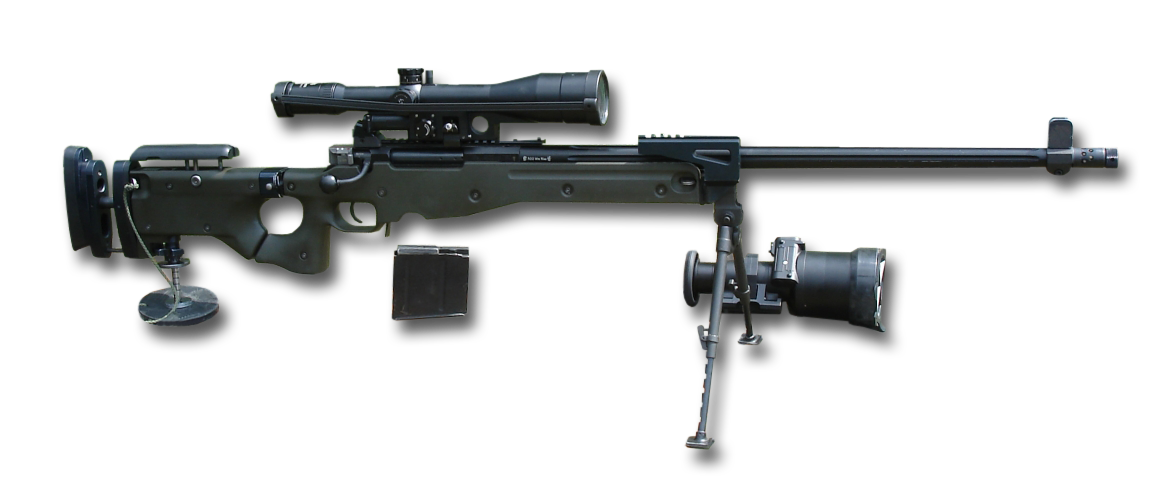
The Accuracy International Arctic Warfare series of sniper rifles is standard issue in the armies of several countries, including those of Britain, Ireland, and Germany (picture shows a rifle of the German Army).

A sniper rifle is a long-range, high-precision rifle. Requirements include high accuracy, reliability, mobility, concealment, and optics, for anti-personnel, anti-materiel and surveillance uses by military snipers. The modern sniper rifle is a portable shoulder-fired rifle with either a bolt action or semi-automatic action, fitted with a telescopic sight for extreme accuracy and chambered for a high-ballistic performance centerfire cartridge.

== History ==
The Whitworth rifle was arguably the first long-range sniper rifle in the world. Designed in 1854 by Sir Joseph Whitworth, a prominent British engineer, it used barrels with hexagonal polygonal rifling, which meant that the projectile did not have to "bite" into the rifling grooves as with conventional rifling. His rifle was far more accurate than the Pattern 1853 Enfield, which had shown weaknesses during the Crimean War. At trials in 1857, which tested the accuracy and range of both weapons, Whitworth's design outperformed the Enfield at a rate of about three to one. The Whitworth rifle was able to hit the target at a range of 2,000 yards (around 1,830 meters), whereas the Enfield could only manage it at a distance of 1,400 yards (around 1,280 meters). During the American Civil War, Confederate sharpshooters equipped with Whitworth rifles were tasked to kill Union field artillery crews, and were responsible for killing Major General John Sedgwick—one of the highest-ranking officers killed during the Civil War—at the Battle of Spotsylvania Court House.

During the Crimean War, the first optical sights were designed for fitting onto the rifles. Much of this pioneering work was the brainchild of a Colonel D. Davidson, using optical sights produced by Chance Brothers of Birmingham. This allowed a marksman to more accurately observe and target objects at a greater distance than ever before. The telescopic sight, or scope, was originally fixed and could not be adjusted, which therefore limited its range. By the 1870s, the perfection of breech loading magazine rifles led to sniper rifles having "effective accurate" ranges of up to a mile away from their target.

=== 20th century ===
During the Second Boer War, the latest breech-loading rifles with magazines and smokeless powder were used by both sides. The British were equipped with the Lee–Metford rifle, while the Boers had received the latest Mauser Model 1895 rifles from Germany. In the open terrain of South Africa, the marksman was a crucial component in battle. The Lovat Scouts was a British Army unit formed in 1899 that was renowned for the expert marksmanship and stalking skills of its personnel. The men wore ghillie suits for camouflage and were expertly skilled in observation. Hesketh Hesketh-Prichard said of them that "keener men never lived". After the Boer War, the Scouts became the first official sniper unit in the British Army.

It was not until World War I that sniper rifles began to be used more regularly in battle and certain soldiers given specialized training to use such a rifle. In Germany, these trained snipers were given rifles with telescopic sights, which illuminated at night in order to improve their accuracy. German gunsmiths fitted the scope above the barrel for optimal accuracy.

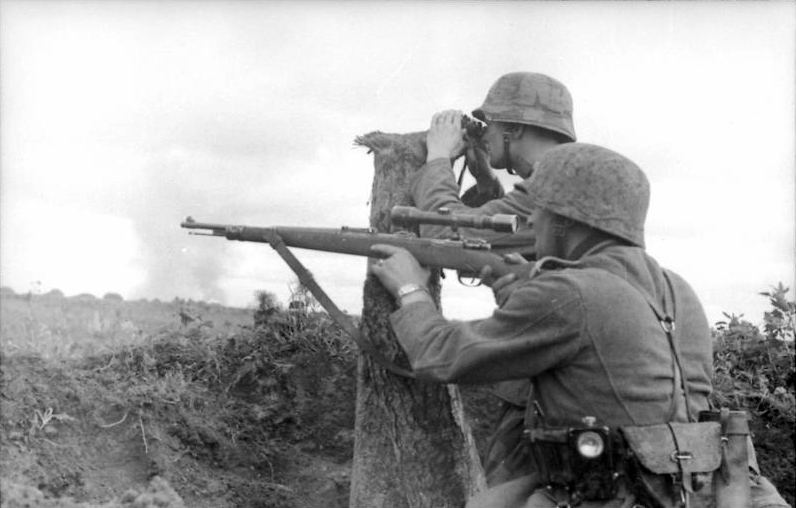
German sniper aiming his Karabiner 98k with 4×36 Zeiss ZF39 telescopic sight.

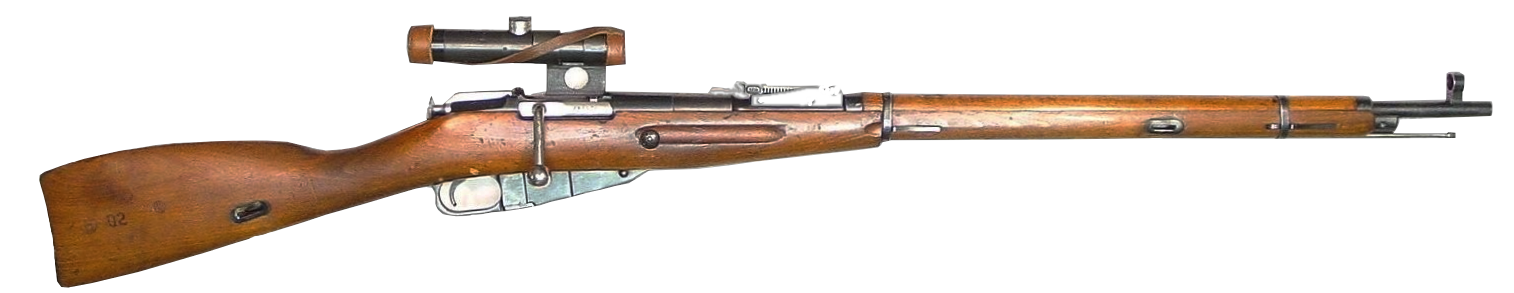
Russian Model 1891/30 sniper rifle with PU 3.5×21 sight

During World War I, the accuracy of the sniper rifle was greatly improved. By the end of World War II, snipers were reported to provide "reasonable accuracy" over 600 m (656 yd) with anything over this range being unpredictable. It was during World War I and II that the word ‘sniper’ began to be used commonly, whereas previously those who were armed with sniper rifles were referred to as sharpshooters or marksmen. These marksmen, wielding sniper rifles such as the Karabiner 98k and Mosin–Nagant Model 1891/30 sniper rifle, had a drastic and demoralizing effect on the battlefield. Soldiers would often remain hidden in foxholes so as not to expose themselves to the deadly accuracy of a sniper. Some soldiers even began to disregard orders from commanding officers to protect against potential harm, which thus broke down the chain of command on the battlefield. The sniper rifle soon acquired the reputation of being one of the most effective and ruthless weapons of war.

Though sniper rifles had proved to be extremely effective in combat, there was still a great reluctance in many militaries to adopt a trained sniper regiment. To effectively use a sniper rifle, a soldier had to go through particularly rigorous training, and most trainees did not make it past the first week. Sniper training was also so expensive to conduct that, even until as recently as 1970, the reasoning for having trained snipers as a part of an army was deemed questionable. In Britain, sniper rifles were not seen as being an integral part of an army until after the Germans boasted of their success with sniper teams during the early months of World War I. British army advisors supposed that the telescopic sights attached to sniper rifles were too easily damaged and thus not well suited for military use. However, they soon realized that these telescopic sights could be improved and made sturdy enough to consistently withstand the recoil of a sniper rifle shot.

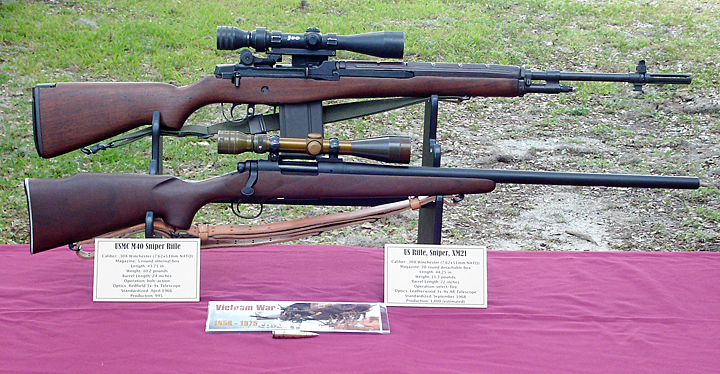
Vietnam War era sniper rifles, US Army XM21 (top) and USMC M40 (bottom)

Sniper rifles have continued to be used consistently throughout the later part of the 20th century in Korea, Vietnam and the Middle East as an integral part of the modern style of guerrilla warfare.

=== 21st century ===
The durability, accuracy and power of sniper rifles circa 2010 are beyond anything in use even ten years prior, and dwarf those of World War II sniper rifles. Modern sniper rifles are very reliable and are able to fire repeatedly without losing accuracy, whereas earlier sniper rifles were more liable to lose accuracy due to wear and tear. Sniper rifles continue to be adapted and improved upon, with the effective range of sniper rifles (c. 2001) exceeding 1,000 m (1,094 yd), making them one of the most accurate and efficient weapons in use.

== Classification ==
Modern sniper rifles can be divided into two basic classes: military and law enforcement.

=== Military ===
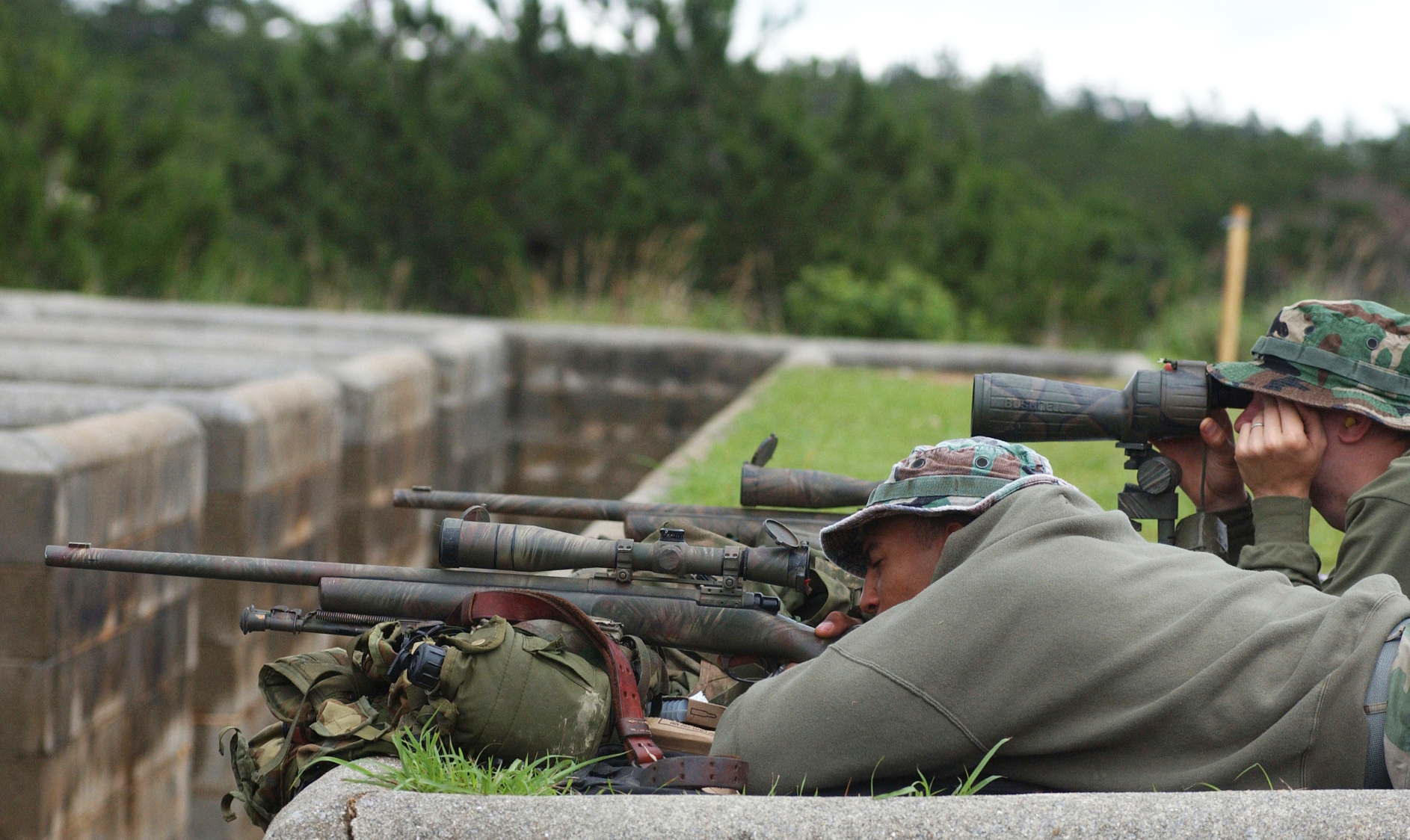
U.S. Marine Corps SRT sniper team with an M24 sniper rifle, during sniper training

Sniper rifles manufactured for military service are often designed for very high durability, range, reliability, sturdiness, serviceability, and repairability under adverse environmental and combat conditions, at the sacrifice of a small degree of accuracy. Military snipers and sharpshooters may also be required to carry their rifles and other equipment for long distances, making it important to minimize weight. Military organizations often operate under strict budget constraints, which influences the type and quality of sniper rifles they purchase.

=== Law enforcement ===
Sniper rifles built or modified for use in law enforcement are generally required to have the greatest possible accuracy, but do not need to have as long of a range.

Law enforcement-specific rifles are usually used in non-combat (often urban) environments, so they do not have the requirement to be as hardy or portable as military versions; they may also be smaller due to the decrease in required range.

Some of the first sniper rifles designed specifically to meet police and other law-enforcement requirements were developed for West German police after the Munich massacre at the 1972 Summer Olympics. Many police services and law enforcement organizations (such as the U.S. Secret Service) now use rifles designed for law enforcement purposes.

The Heckler & Koch PSG1 is one rifle specifically designed to meet these criteria and is often referred to as an ideal example of this type of sniper rifle. The FN Special Police Rifle was built for, and is marketed to, law enforcement rather than military agencies.

== Distinguishing characteristics ==
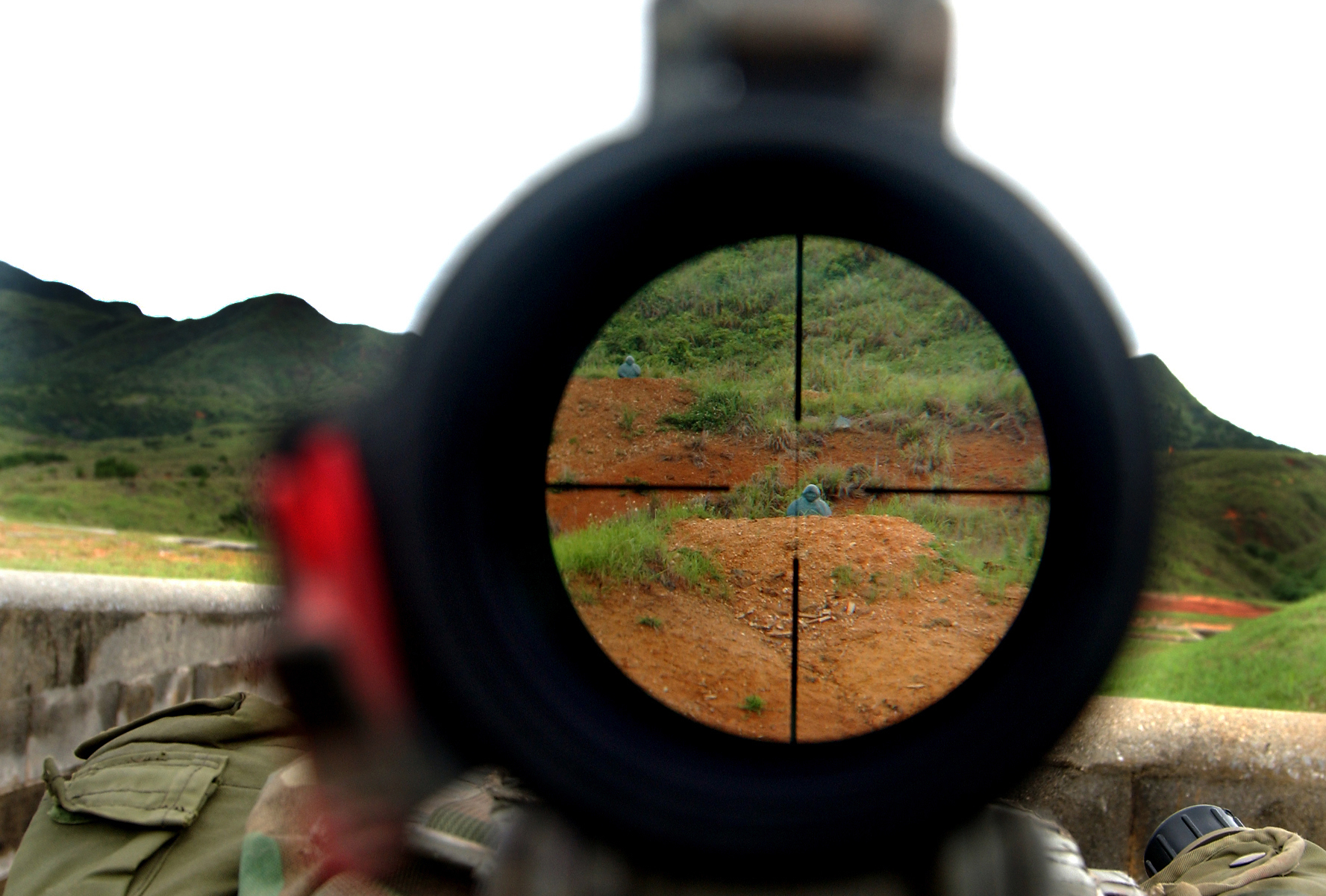
Looking through a telescopic sight

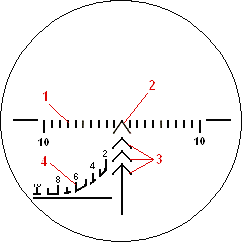
PSO-1 reticle 1 – Lead/deflection scale 2 – Main targeting chevron 3 – Bullet drop chevrons 4 – Rangefinder

The features of a sniper rifle can vary widely depending on the specific tasks it is intended to perform. Features that may distinguish a sniper rifle from other weapons are the presence of a telescopic sight, unusually long overall length, a stock designed for firing from a prone position, and the presence of a bipod and other accessories.

=== Telescopic sight ===
Perhaps the single most important characteristic that sets a sniper rifle apart from other military or police small arms is the mounting of a telescopic sight, which is relatively easy to distinguish from smaller optical aiming devices found on some modern assault rifles and submachine guns (such as reflector sights). The telescopic sights used on sniper rifles differ from other optical sights in that they offer much greater magnification (more than 4× and up to 40×) and have a much larger objective lens (40 to 50 mm in diameter) for a brighter image.

Most telescopic lenses employed in military or police roles also have special reticles to aid with judgment of distance, which is an important factor in accurate shot placement due to the bullet's trajectory.

=== Action ===
The choice between bolt-action and semi-automatic, usually recoil operation or gas operation for the latter, is usually determined by specific requirements of the sniper's role in a particular organization, with each design having advantages and disadvantages. For a given cartridge, a bolt-action rifle is cheaper to build and maintain, more reliable, and lighter, due to fewer moving parts in the mechanism. In addition, the absence of uncontrolled automatic cartridge case ejection helps avoid revealing the shooter's position. Semi-automatic weapons can serve both as a battle rifle and sniper rifle and allow for a greater rate (and hence volume) of fire. As such rifles may be modified service rifles, an additional benefit can be commonality of operation with the issued infantry rifle. A bolt action is most commonly used in both military and police roles due to its higher accuracy and ease of maintenance. Special forces operators tend to prefer semi-automatic rifles over bolt-action rifles for certain applications such as detonating unexploded ordnance from a safe distance and penetrating reinforced structures that enemy combatants are using as cover.

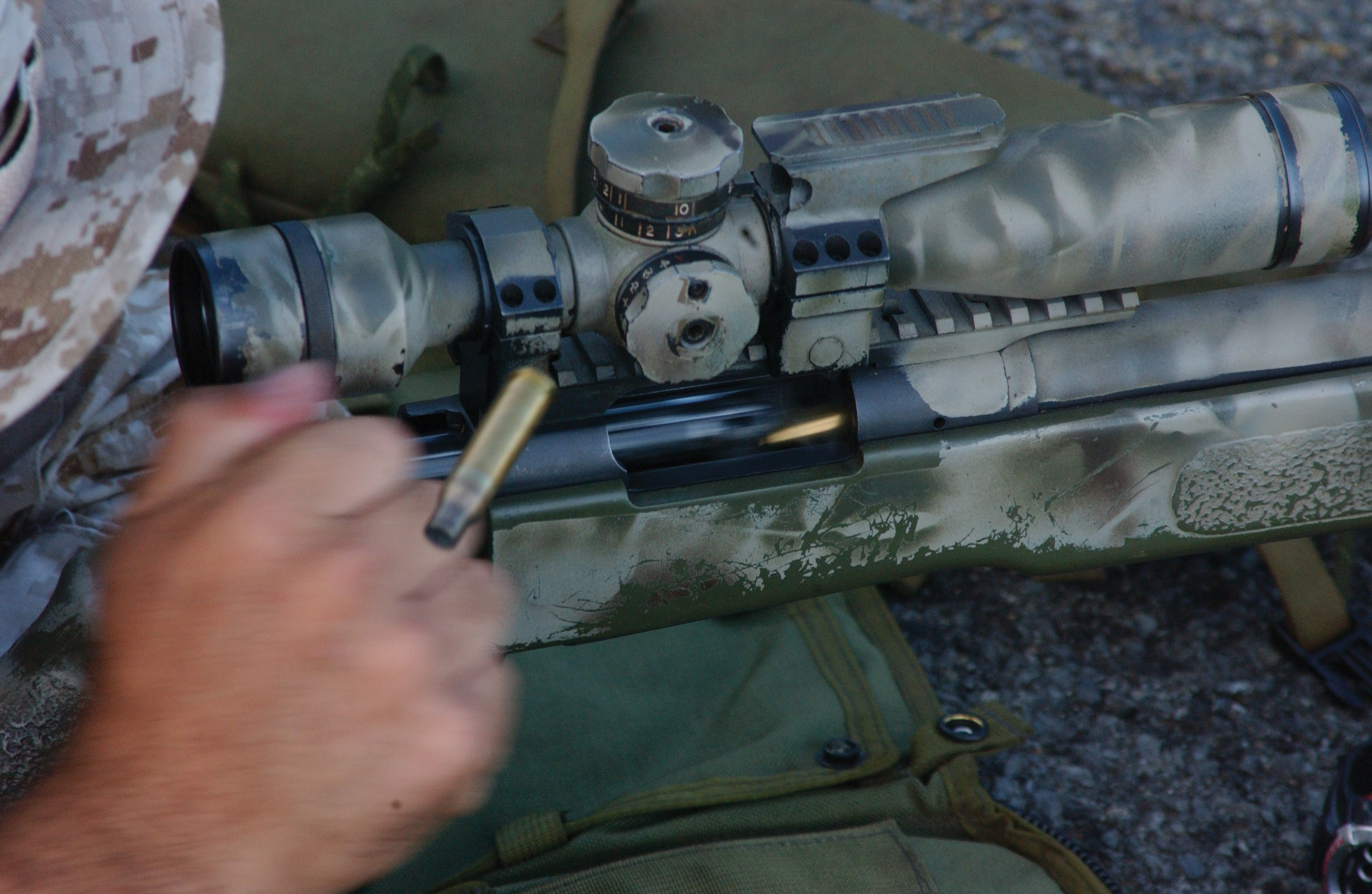
A Marine manually extracts an empty cartridge and chambers a new 7.62×51mm round in his bolt-action M40A3 sniper rifle. The bolt handle is held in the shooter's hand and is not visible in this photo.

A designated marksman rifle (DMR) is less specialized than a typical military sniper rifle, often only intended to extend the range of a group of soldiers. Therefore, when a semi-automatic action is used, it is due to an overlap with the roles of standard-issue weapons. There may also be additional logistical advantages if the DMR uses the same ammunition as the more common standard-issue weapons. These rifles enable a higher volume of fire, but sacrifice some long-range accuracy. They are frequently built from existing selective fire battle rifles or assault rifles, often simply by adding a telescopic sight and adjustable stock.

A police semi-automatic sniper rifle may be used in situations that require a single sniper to engage multiple targets in quick succession; military semi-automatics, such as the M110 SASS, are used in similar "target-rich" environments.

=== Magazine ===
Sako TRG-42 rifle with .338 Lapua Magnum cartridges used by an Italian soldier in Herat, Afghanistan.

In a military setting, logistical concerns are the primary determinant of the cartridge used, so sniper rifles are usually limited to rifle cartridges commonly used by the military force employing the rifle and match grade ammunition. Since large national militaries generally change slowly, military rifle ammunition is frequently battle-tested and well-studied by ammunition and firearms experts. Consequently, police forces tend to follow military practices in choosing a sniper rifle cartridge instead of trying to break new ground with less-perfected (but possibly better) ammunition.

Before the introduction of the standard 7.62×51mm NATO (.308 Winchester) cartridge in the 1950s, standard military cartridges were the .30-06 Springfield (7.62×63mm) (United States), .303 British (7.7×56mmR) (United Kingdom), and 7.92×57 mm Mauser (Germany). The .30-06 Springfield continued in service with U.S. Marine Corps snipers during the Vietnam War in the 1970s, well after general adoption of the 7.62×51mm. At the present time, in both the Western world and within NATO, the 7.62×51mm is currently the primary cartridge of choice for military and police sniper rifles.

Worldwide, the trend is similar. The preferred sniper cartridge in Russia is another .30 caliber military cartridge, the 7.62×54mmR, which has slightly superior performance to the 7.62×51mm, although the rimmed design limits reliability compared to the latter cartridge. This cartridge was introduced in 1891, and both Russian sniper rifles of the modern era, the Mosin–Nagant and the SVD, are chambered for it.

Certain commercial cartridges designed with only performance in mind, without the logistical constraints of most armies, have also gained popularity in the 1990s. These include the 7mm Remington Magnum (7.2×64mm), .300 Winchester Magnum (7.62×67mm), and the .338 Lapua Magnum (8.6×70mm). These cartridges offer better ballistic performance and greater effective range than the 7.62×51mm. Though they are not as powerful as .50 caliber cartridges, rifles chambered for these cartridges are not as heavy as those chambered for .50 caliber ammunition and are significantly more powerful than rifles chambered for 7.62×51mm.

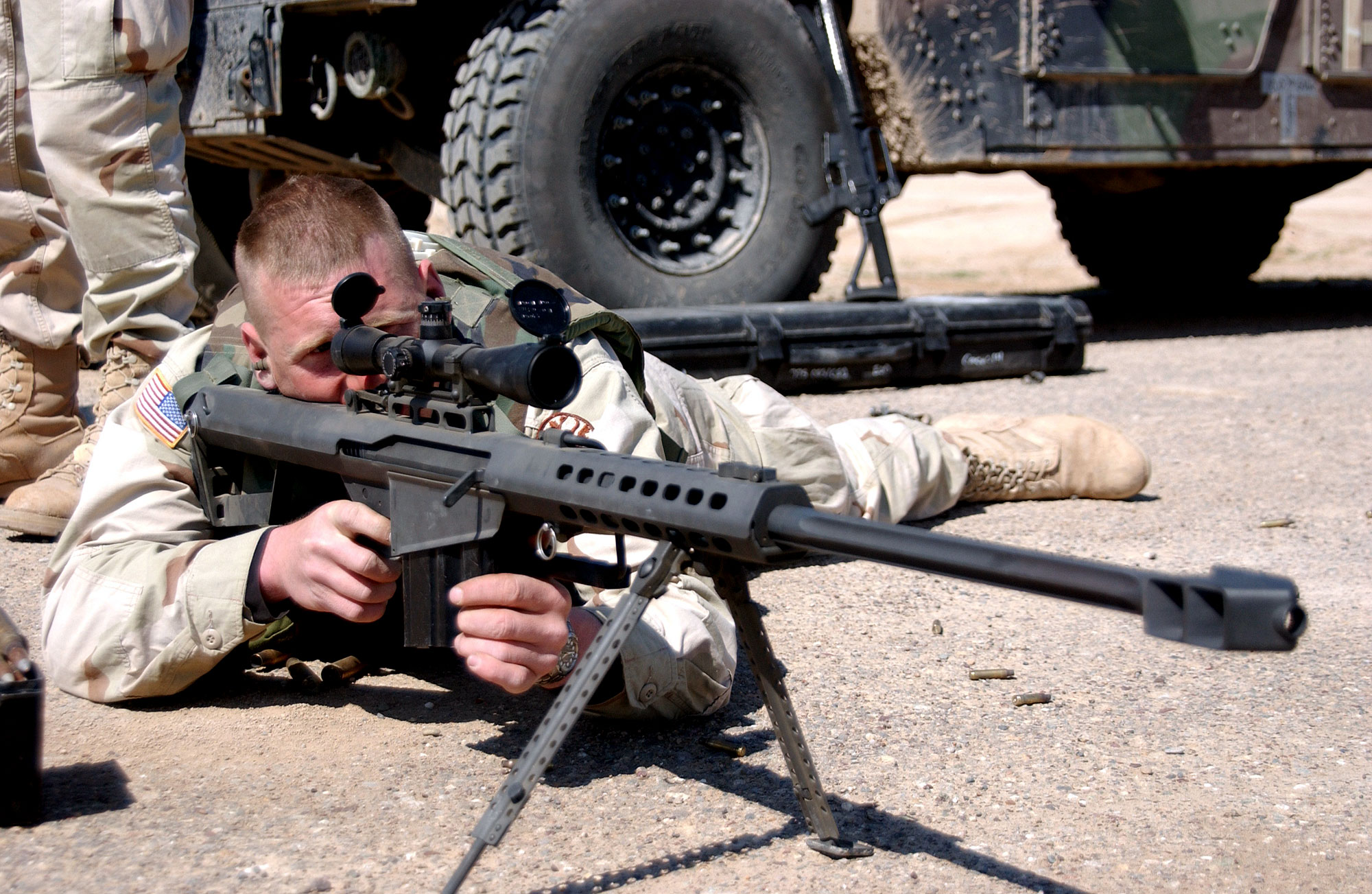
M82A1 SASR (Special Applications Scoped Rifle), a .50-caliber anti-materiel rifle also used as a sniper rifle

Snipers may also employ anti-materiel rifles in sniping roles against targets such as vehicles, equipment and structures, or for the long-range destruction of explosive devices; these rifles may also be used against personnel.

Anti-materiel rifles tend to be semi-automatic and of a larger caliber than other rifles, using cartridges such as the .50 BMG (12.7×99mm), 12.7×108mm, 14.5×114mm, and 20mm. These large cartridges are required to be able to fire projectiles containing payloads such as explosives, armor-piercing cores, incendiaries or combinations of these, such as the Raufoss Mk 211 projectile. Due to the considerable size and weight of anti-materiel rifles, two- or three-man sniper teams become necessary.

=== Barrel ===
Barrels are normally of precise manufacture and of a heavier cross section than more traditional barrels, in order to reduce the change in impact points between a first shot from a cold barrel and a follow-up shot from a warm barrel. Unlike many battle and assault rifles, the bores are usually not chromed to avoid inaccuracy due to an uneven treatment.

When installed, barrels are often free-floating—installed so that the barrel contacts the rest of the rifle only at the receiver. A free-floating barrel avoids contact with the fore-end of the stock by the barrel itself, sling, bipod, or the sniper's hands that can interfere with barrel harmonics. The end of the barrel is usually crowned or machined to form a rebated area around the muzzle proper to avoid asymmetry or damage, and consequent inaccuracy.

External longitudinal fluting that contributes to heat dissipation by increasing the surface area, while simultaneously decreasing the weight of the barrel, is sometimes used on sniper rifle barrels.

Sniper-rifle barrels may also utilize a threaded muzzle or combination device (muzzle brake or flash suppressor and attachment mount) to allow the fitting of a suppressor. These suppressors often have a means of adjusting the point of impact while fitted.

Military sniper rifles tend to have barrel lengths of 610 mm (24 in) or longer to allow the cartridge propellant to fully burn, reducing the amount of revealing muzzle flash and increasing muzzle velocity. Police sniper rifles may use shorter barrels to improve handling characteristics. The shorter barrels' muzzle velocity loss is unimportant at closer ranges; the impact velocity of the bullet is more than sufficient.

=== Stock ===
The most common special feature of a sniper rifle stock is the adjustable cheek piece, where the shooter's cheek meets the rear of the stock. For most rifles equipped with a telescopic sight, this area is raised slightly because the telescope is positioned higher than iron sights, and can sometimes be adjusted up or down to suit the individual shooter. To further aid this individual fitting, the stock can sometimes also be adjusted for length, often by varying the number of inserts at the rear of the stock where it meets the shooter's shoulder. If the stock is manufactured from wood, environmental conditions or operational use may warp the wood, causing slight alignment or barrel harmonics changes over time and altering the point of impact. Stocks manufactured from polymers and metal alloys are less susceptible to point of impact shifting from environmental conditions. Sniper stocks are typically designed to avoid making contact with the barrel of the weapon to minimize the effects of environmental inconstancies. Modern sniper rifle stocks tend to be designed around a rigid chassis, offer user adjustability to allow shooters of various sizes and shapes to tailor the stock to their personal preferences, and modular attachment points to accommodate low-light and daylight aiming optics, laser designators, and other accessories without the need for custom-made mounting interface kits.

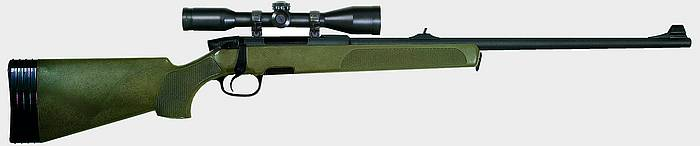
Steyr SSG 69 PI (1969) with classic shaped polymer stock with removable spacers to adjust the length of pull.

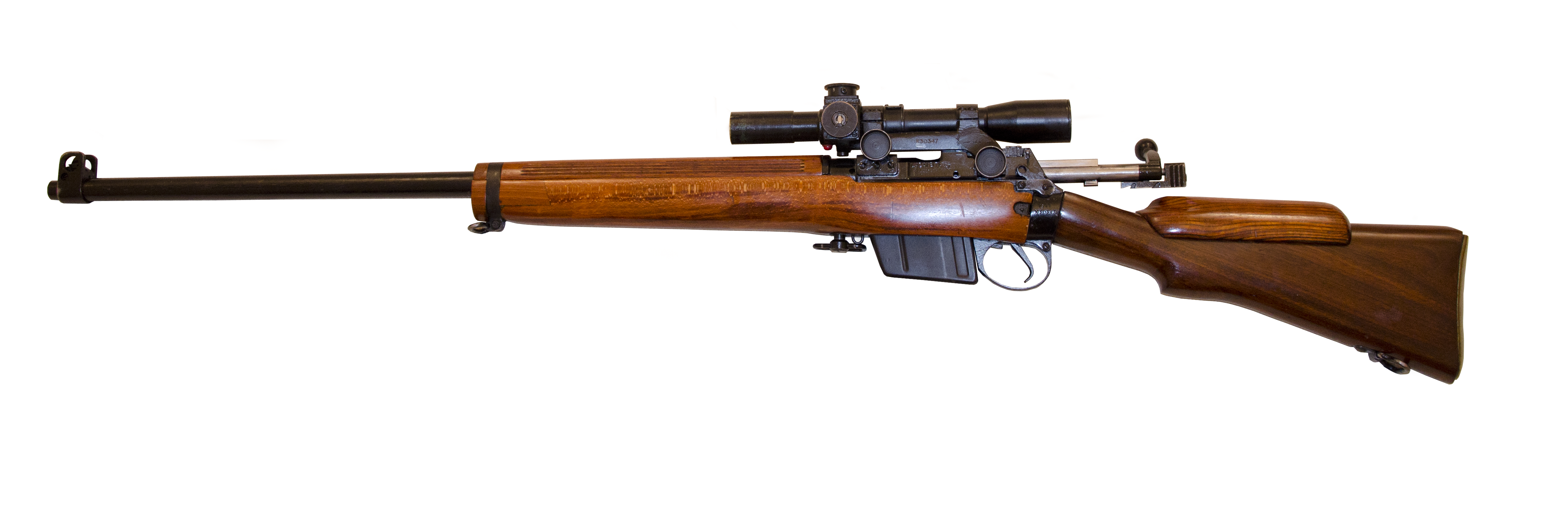
L42A1 (1970) with classic shaped wooden stock with cheek piece and free floating barrel. The L42A1 was a conversion of Lee–Enfield No. 4 Mk1(T) and No. 4 Mk1*(T) World War II-era British sniper rifles.

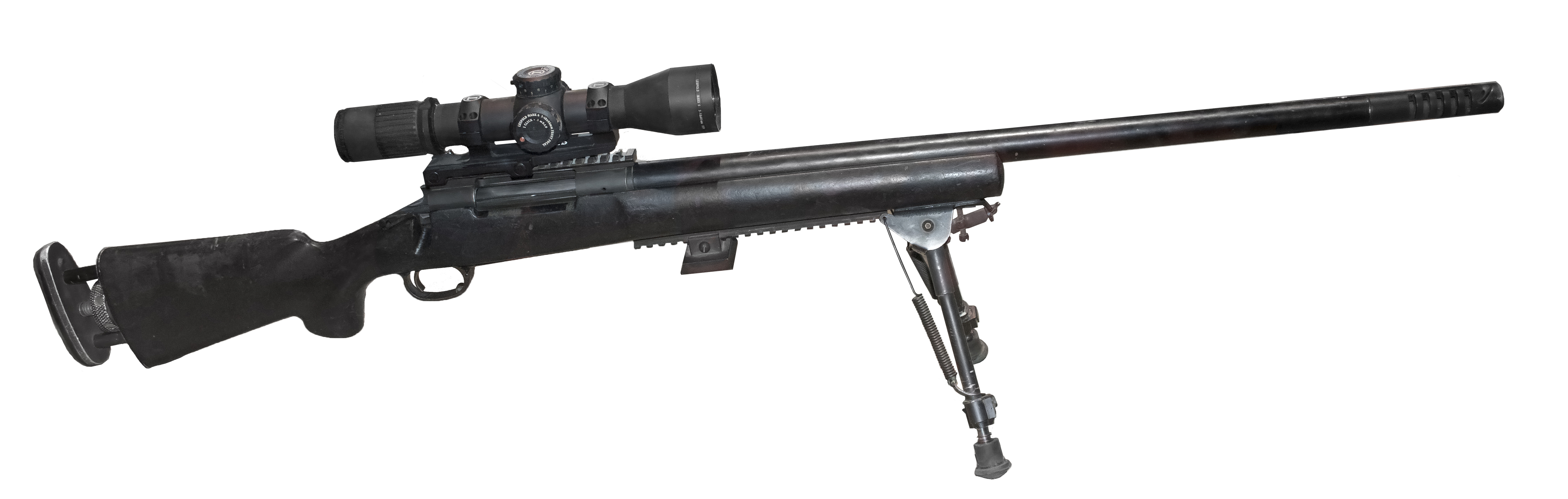
M24 SWS (1988) with classic shaped polymer stock with adjustable length of pull.

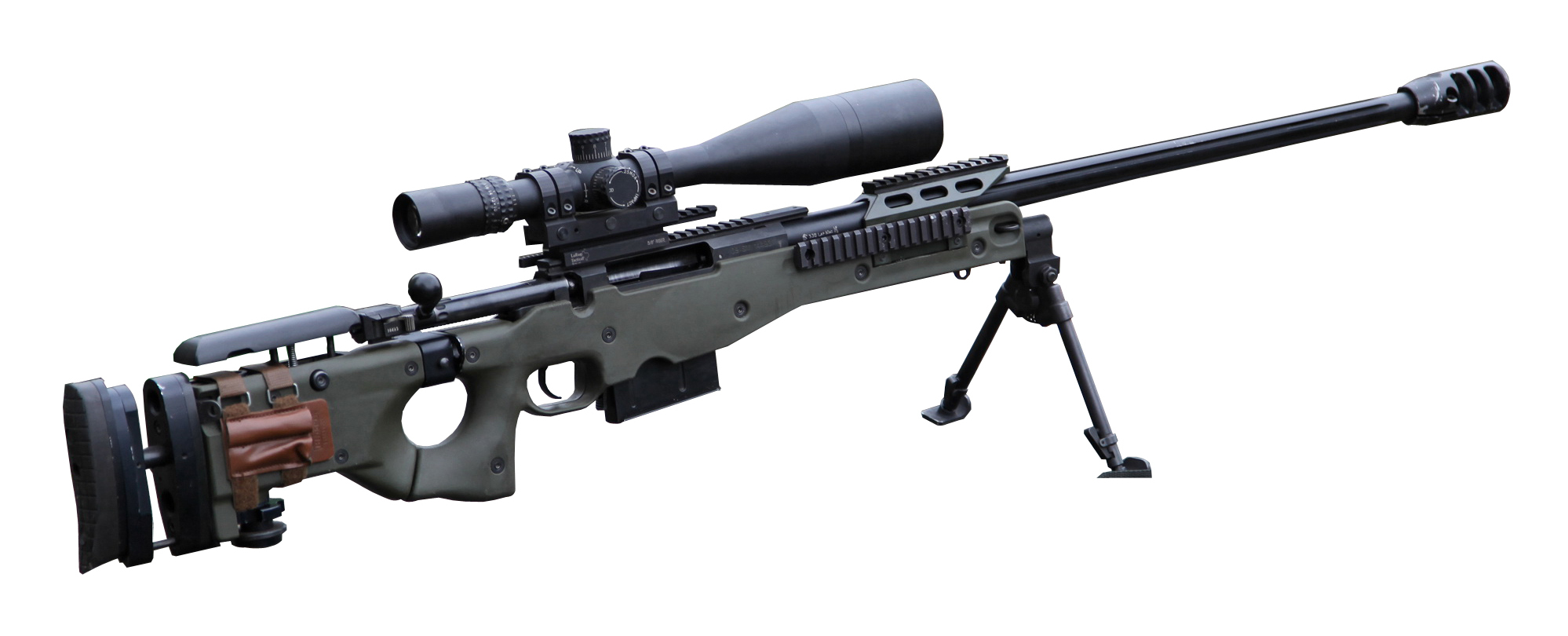
Accuracy International AWM (1996) based on an aluminum alloy chassis stock with fully adjustable side-folding thumb hole polymer stock side panels and custom Picatinny rail mounting interface.

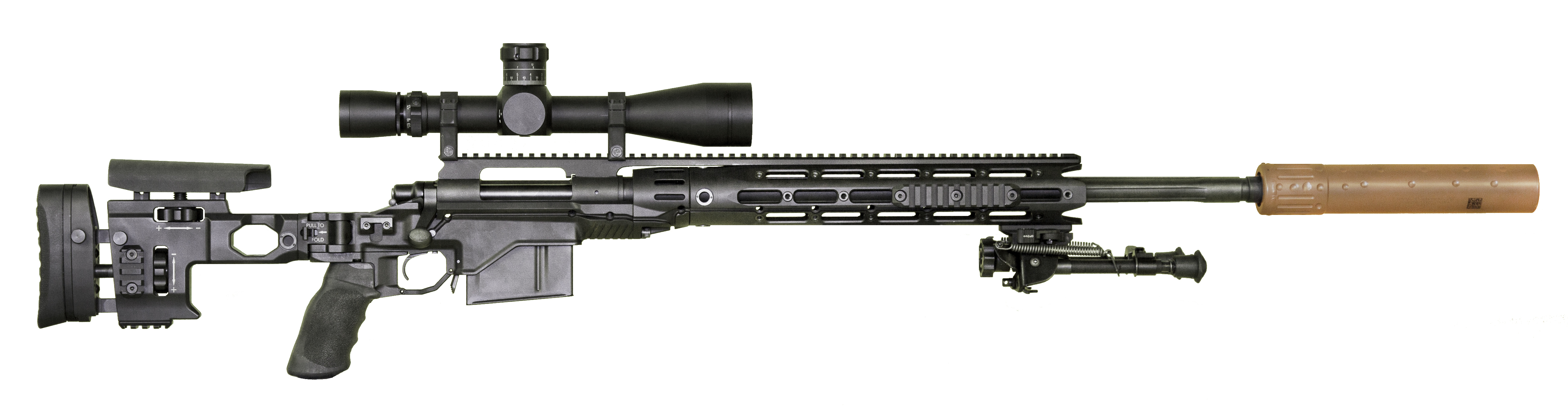
M2010 ESR (2011) "M24 SWS total conversion upgrade" based on an aluminum alloy chassis stock with fully adjustable side-folding buttstock and tubular handguard offering rail integration system attachment points.

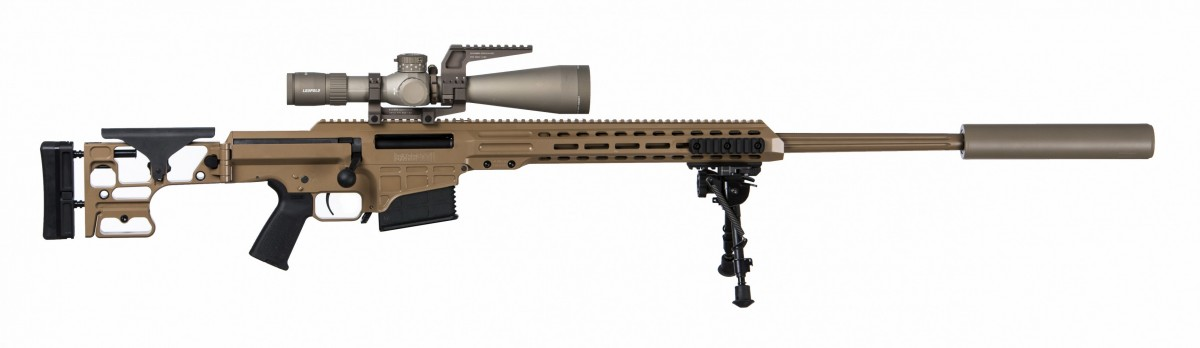
Barrett MRAD (MK 22 PSR) (2013) multi-caliber modular sniper rifle based on an aluminum alloy chassis stock with fully adjustable side-folding buttstock and a front offering rail interface system attachment points, with mounted Picatinny rails for tactical attachments.

=== Accessories ===
An adjustable sling is often fitted on the rifle, used by the sniper to achieve better stability when standing, kneeling, or sitting. The sniper uses the sling to "lock in" by wrapping their non-firing arm into the sling, keeping that arm still.

Non-static weapon mounts, such as bipods, monopods, and shooting sticks, are also regularly used to aid and improve stability and reduce operator fatigue.

Shooting bags are also commonly used to help stabilize the rifle or to provide an adjustable base.

== Capabilities ==
=== Accuracy ===
Comparison of 0.5, 1, and 3 MOA extreme spread levels against a human torso at 800 m (left) and a human head at 100 m (right)

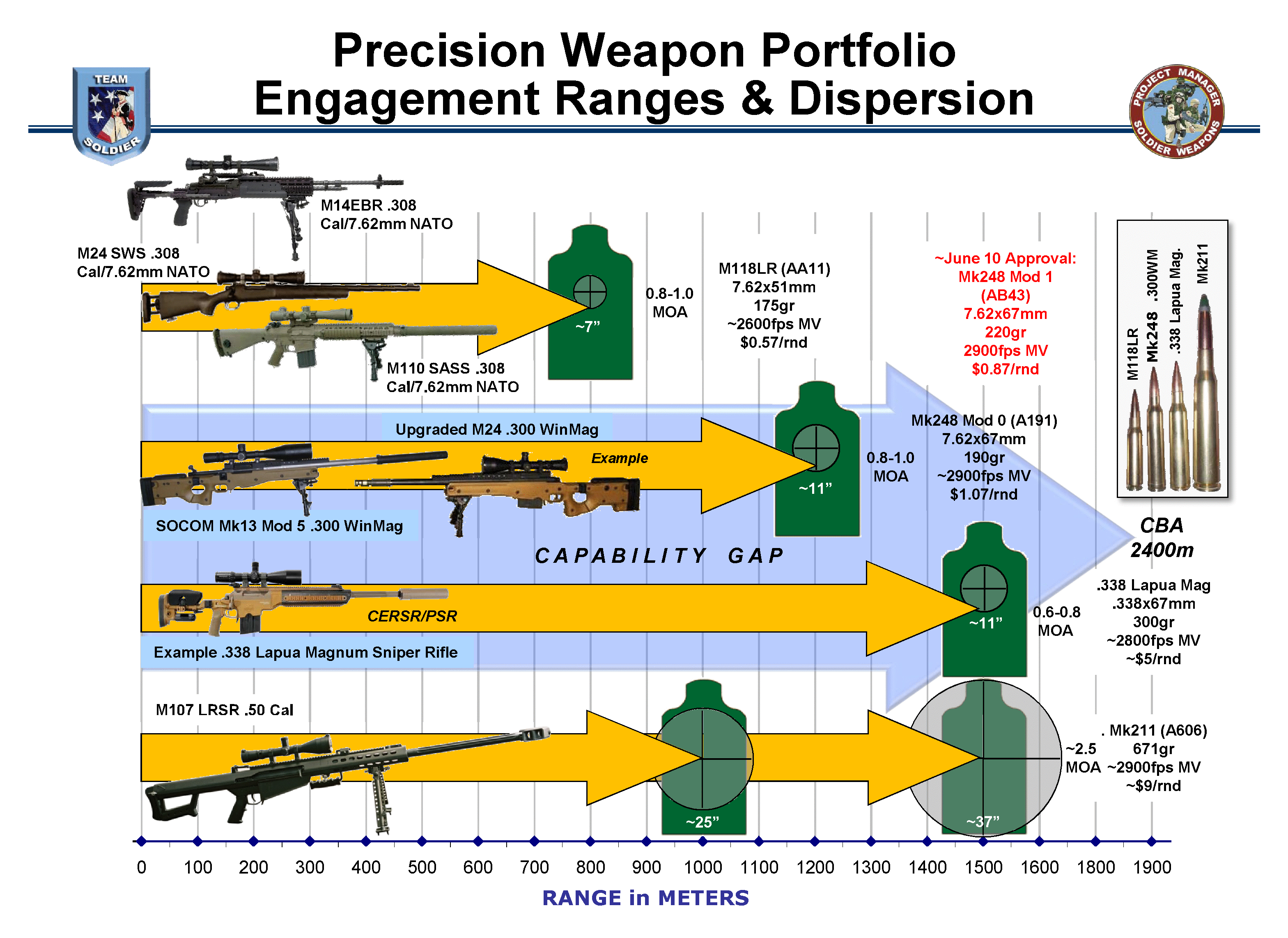
Precision Weapon Engagement Ranges & Dispersion according to the US Army

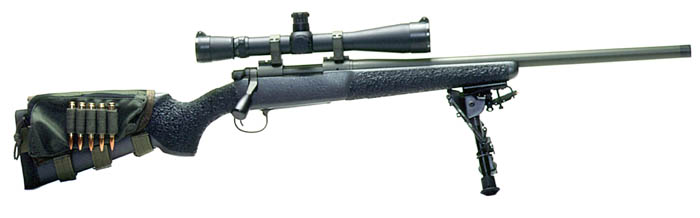
The Tango 51 sniper rifle has an accuracy guarantee of 0.25 MOA (0.07 mrad)

A military-issue battle rifle or assault rifle is usually capable of between 3–6 minute of angle (0.9–1.7 milliradian) accuracy. A standard-issue military sniper rifle is typically capable of 1–3 MOA (0.3–0.9 mrad) accuracy, with a police sniper rifle capable of 0.25–1.5 MOA (0.1–0.4 mrad) accuracy. For comparison, a competition target or benchrest rifle may be capable of accuracy up to 0.15–0.3 MOA (0.04–0.09 mrad).

A 1 MOA (0.28 mrad) average extreme spread (the center-to-center distance between the two most distant bullet holes) for a 5-shot group translates into a 69% probability that the bullet's point of impact will be in a target circle with a diameter of 23.3 cm (9.2 in) at 800 m (875 yd). This average extreme spread for a 5-shot group and the accompanying hit probability are considered sufficient for effectively hitting a human at an 800-meter distance.

In 1982, a U.S. Army draft requirement for a Sniper Weapon System was: "The System will: (6) Have an accuracy of no more than 0.75 MOA (0.2 mrad) for a 5-shot group at 1,500 meters when fired from a supported, non-benchrest position". The M24 Sniper Weapon System adopted in 1988 has a stated maximum effective range of 800 meters and a maximum allowed average mean radius (AMR) of 1.9 inches at 300 yards from a machine rest, which corresponds to a 0.6 MOA (0.17 mrad) extreme spread for a 5-shot group when using 7.62×51mm M118 Special Ball cartridges.

A 2008 United States military market survey for a Precision Sniper Rifle (PSR) called for 1 MOA (0.3 mrad) extreme vertical spread for all shots in a 5-round group fired at targets at 300, 600, 900, 1,200 and 1,500 meters. In 2009, a United States Special Operations Command market survey called for a 1 MOA (0.28 mrad) extreme vertical spread for all shots in a 10-round group fired at targets at 300, 600, 900, 1,200, and 1,500 meters. The 2009 Precision Sniper Rifle requirements state that the PSR, when fired without a suppressor, shall provide a confidence factor of 80% that the weapon and ammunition combination is capable of holding 1 MOA (0.28 mrad) extreme vertical spread, calculated from 150 ten-round groups that were fired unsuppressed. No individual group was to exceed 1.5 MOA (0.42 mrad) extreme vertical spread. All accuracy was taken at the 1,500 meter point.

In 2008, the US military adopted the M110 Semi-Automatic Sniper System, which has a maximum allowed extreme spread of 1.8 MOA (0.5 mrad) for a 5-shot group on 300 feet, using M118LR ammunition or equivalent. In 2010, the maximum bullet dispersion requirement for the M24 .300 Winchester Magnum corresponded to 1.4 MOA (0.39 mrad) extreme spread for 5 shot group on 100 meters. In 2011, the US military adapted the .300 Winchester Magnum M2010 Enhanced Sniper Rifle, which had to meet an accuracy requirement to fire ≤ 1 MOA/0.28 mrad (less than a 2-inch shot group at 200 yards) before being released for fielding.

Although accuracy standards for police rifles do not widely exist, rifles are frequently seen with accuracy levels from 0.5 to 1.5 MOA (0.2–0.5 mrad). For typical policing situations, an extreme spread accuracy level no better than 1 MOA (0.3 mrad) is usually all that is required, as police typically employ their rifles at shorter ranges. At 100 m (109 yd) or less, a rifle with a relatively low accuracy of only 1 MOA (0.3 mrad) should be able to repeatedly hit a 3 cm (1.2 inch) target. A 3 cm diameter target is smaller than the brain stem, which is targeted by police snipers for its quick killing effect.

Cartridge	Maximum effective range (m)
5.45×39mm	600–800
5.56×45mm NATO	600–800
7.62×51mm NATO	800–1,000
7.62×54mmR	800–1,000
.300 Winchester Magnum	900–1,200
.338 Lapua Magnum	1,200–1,500
12.7×99mm NATO	1,500–2,000
12.7×108mm	1,500–2,000
14.5×114mm	1,800–2,300

== See also ==
- List of sniper rifles
- Longest recorded sniper kills
- Long range shooting
- Precision-guided firearm
- Fully powered cartridge

Related military roles

- Designated marksman
- Scout sniper

Related military weapons

- Anti-materiel rifle
- Anti-tank rifle
- Assault rifle
- Battle rifle
- Carbine rifle
- Designated marksman rifle
