= Sharpshooter =

One who is highly proficient with firearms

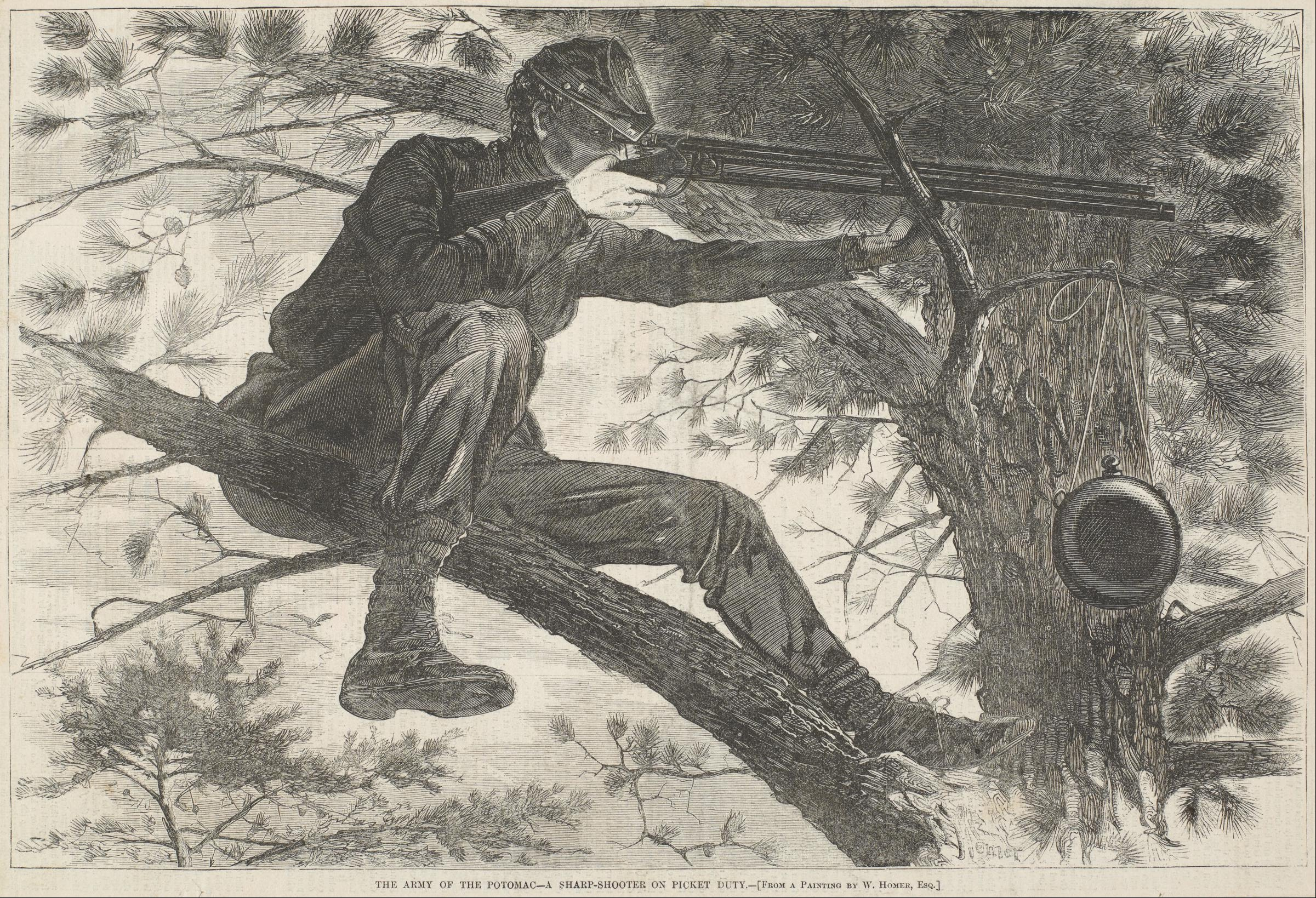
A wood engraving depicting an unidentified sharpshooter for the Army of the Potomac on picket duty during the American Civil War

A sharpshooter is one who is highly proficient at firing firearms or other projectile weapons accurately. Military units composed of sharpshooters were important factors in 19th-century combat. Along with "marksman" and "expert", "sharpshooter" is one of the three marksmanship badges awarded by the United States Army and the United States Marine Corps. The United States Navy and the United States Coast Guard use a ribbon with an attached "S" device to note a sharpshooter qualification.

== Military sharpshooter history ==
=== American Revolutionary War and War of 1812 ===
Some of the earliest mentions of rifling and sharpshooting units in the United States originate during around the American Revolutionary War and the War of 1812. During the 1777 battles of Saratoga, Continental Army officer Benedict Arnold strategically arranged for sharpshooter units to target enemy officers and artillery units. All such sharpshooters units were disbanded following the war's end in 1783, but they were later revived in the United States Army under Anthony Wayne and used in the Battle of Fallen Timbers of the Northwest Indian War in 1794. The unit was again disbanded in 1796 following the conclusion of the conflict. However, over the next decade, tensions between the U.S. and Britain would continue to escalate eventually culminating into the Chesapeake–Leopard affair in 1807. As a result of the incident, the US passed legislation increasing the size of the U.S. Army to allow for the establishment of the Regiment of Riflemen in 1808. As opposed to the standard line infantry equipped with muskets and bright blue and white uniforms, this new regiment focused on specialist light infantry tactics and uniforms were tactically colored in black and green to blend in with surroundings. The unit was equipped with the first American manufactured rifle, the Harpers Ferry Model 1803. Prior to entering the War of 1812, the unit would have seen some of its first combat in the Battle of Tippecanoe in 1811 as part of the preceding Tecumseh's War, though they had fought in this battle using smoothbore muskets. By 1813, the unit had found its way to Canada where they launched a series of raids. In February, under the command of Lieutenant-Colonel Benjamin Forsyth, the regiment led one such successful attack on a British grenadier unit, with one member of the unit later remarking that he had "Never experienced such sharpshooting."

=== Napoleonic Wars (1803–1815) ===
Sharpshooter units were also used during the Napoleonic Wars in the British Army. While most troops at that time used inaccurate smoothbore muskets, the British "Green Jackets" (named for their distinctive green uniforms) used the famous Baker rifle. Through the combination of a leather wad and tight grooves on the inside of the barrel (rifling), this weapon was far more accurate, though slower to load. These Riflemen were the elite of the British Army, and served at the forefront of any engagement, most often in skirmish formation, scouting out and delaying the enemy. Another term; "sharp shooter", was in use in British newspapers as early as 1801. In the Edinburgh Advertiser, 23 June 1801, can be found the following quote in a piece about the North British Militia; "This Regiment has several Field Pieces, and two companies of Sharp Shooters, which are very necessary in the modern "Stile of War"." The term appears even earlier, around 1781, in Continental Europe, translated from the German Scharfschütze.

=== U.S. Civil War (1861–1865) ===
During the American Civil War, sharpshooters were used extensively by both sides. Units such as the 1st United States Sharpshooters played a critical role in the war and benefited from technological advances such as the Minié ball, which could kill a target up to a half mile away and was accurate at 250 yards (230 m). However, despite advancements, proficiency at long-range shooting required extensive training, which many of these units did not receive, and as a result sharpshooters during the civil war would not uniformly adopt long-range tactics akin to modern-day marksmen. Some of these units, however, would have been considered elite and many were well equipped and trained for such shooting. Common duties of sharpshooters included picket duty, scouting, and skirmishing. In some cases, they were placed at the front of columns to engage the enemy first. Their battlefield role could be misunderstood at times. At the Battle of Mine Run, one sharpshooter company was ordered to conduct a bayonet charge, even though they were equipped with rifles that were unable to take bayonets.

==== Union Army ====
Notable sharpshooter units of the Civil War included the 1st and 2nd United States Volunteer Sharpshooter Regiment (USVSR), composed of companies provided by numerous (primarily eastern) Union states. The U.S.V.S.R. were organized by Colonel Hiram Berdan, a self-made millionaire who was reputed to be the best rifle marksman in the nation at that time. There were also battalion size sharp shooter units including the Ohio Battalion Sharp Shooters, The First New York Battalion Sharp Shooters and the First Maine Battalion Sharp Shooters. Both the 1st and 2nd Company Massachusetts Sharpshooters saw extensive combat during the conflict. They were armed with heavy, custom target rifles and Sharps rifles during their service.

There was also an all-Native American company of sharpshooters in the Army of the Potomac. These men, primarily Odawa, Ojibwe, and Potawatomi from northern Michigan, comprised the members of Company K of the 1st Regiment Michigan Volunteer Sharpshooters. This regiment saw intense fighting during the Battle of the Crater. The sharpshooters were recognized for their effective service during the onslaught and the unit suffered a number of casualties:

A few Indians, of the 1st Michigan Sharpshooters, did splendid work. Some of them were mortally wounded, and drawing their blouses over their faces, they chanted death songs and died - four of them in a group.

In the Western Theater were the well known 66th Illinois Veteran Volunteer Infantry Regiment (Western Sharpshooters), originally known as "Birge's Western Sharpshooters" and later the "Western Sharpshooters-14th Missouri Volunteers". The regiment was raised by MG John C. Fremont at St. Louis' Benton Barracks as the Western Theater counterpart to Berdan's sharpshooters. Members were recruited from most of the Western states, predominantly Ohio, Michigan, Illinois and Missouri. Competitive induction required candidates to place ten shots in a three-inch circle at 200 yards (180 m). They were initially armed with half-stock Plains Rifles built and procured by St. Louis custom gunmaker Horace (H.E.) Dimick.

These "Dimick Rifles" (as they were known in the unit) were modified for military use by the installation of the Lawrence Patent Sight, and fired a special "Swiss-chasseur" minie ball selected by Horice Dimick for its ballistic accuracy. They were the only Federal unit completely armed with "sporting rifles". Beginning in the autumn of 1863 soldiers of the regiment began to reequip themselves with the new 16 shot, lever action Henry Repeating Rifle giving them a significant advantage in firepower over their opponents. Over 250 of the Western Sharpshooters purchased Henrys out of their own pocket, at an average price of forty dollars (over three months pay for a Private). Illinois Governor Richard Yates provided Henrys for some members of the 64th Illinois Volunteer Infantry Regiment or Yates Sharpshooters and other soldiers of the unit appear to have similarly equipped themselves with Henry Rifles in 1864.

==== Confederate Army ====
On the Confederate side, sharpshooter units functioned as light infantry. Their duties included skirmishing and reconnaissance. Robert E. Rodes, colonel of the 5th Alabama Infantry Regiment, and later a major general, was a leader in the development of sharpshooter units. The Confederate States Army made more widespread use of sharpshooters than Federal forces, often having semi-permanent detachments at the regimental level and battalions of various size attached to larger formations. Dedicated sharpshooter units included the 1st Georgia Sharpshooter Battalion and three more from that state, the 9th (Pindall's) Battalion Missouri Sharpshooters as well as the sharpshooter battalions of the Army of Northern Virginia.

Confederate sharpshooters were often less well equipped than their Union counterparts, commonly using the muzzleloading Enfield Rifled Musket or (the more uncommon) hexagonal bore British Whitworth rifles, and also equipped breechloading round like the captured Berdan Sharps rifles used by the Union Army. These marksmen accompanied regular infantrymen and were usually tasked with eliminating Union artillery crews. However, the exceptional long-range accuracy of the Whitworth rifle allowed the eponymous Whitworth Sharpshooters to score several high-profile kills, including the infamous deaths of Brigadier General William Lytle at Chickamauga and Major General John Sedgwick at the Spotsylvania.

In his memoirs, Confederate soldier Louis Leon detailed his service as a sharpshooter in the Fifty-Third North Carolina Regiment during the Civil War. As a sharpshooter, he volunteered as a skirmisher, served on picket duty, and engaged in considerable shooting practice. Of his company's original twelve sharpshooters, only he and one other were still alive after Gettysburg. As related by the regiment's commanding officer, Col. James Morehead, in a rare one-on-one encounter Pvt. Leon killed a Union sharpshooter, whom the Confederates identified as a "Canadian Indian".

== Noted sharpshooters ==
- Annie Oakley (1860–1926)
- Calamity Jane (1852–1903)
- Alvin York (1887–1964)

== See also ==
- Designated marksman
- Marksman
- Sniper
