= Polygonal rifling =

Type of gun barrel rifling

Conventional eight groove rifling on the left, and octagonal polygonal rifling on the right

Polygonal rifling (/pəˈlɪɡənəl/ pə-LIG-ə-nəl) is a type of gun barrel rifling where the traditional sharp-edged "lands and grooves" are replaced by less pronounced "hills and valleys", so the barrel bore has a polygonal (usually hexagonal or octagonal) cross-sectional profile.

Polygonal riflings with a larger number of edges have shallower corners, which provide a better gas seal in relatively large diameter bores. For instance, in the pre-Gen 5 Glock pistols, octagonal rifling is used in the large diameter .45 ACP bore, which has an 11.23 mm (0.442 in) diameter, since it resembles a circle more closely than the hexagonal rifling used in smaller diameter bores.

== History ==
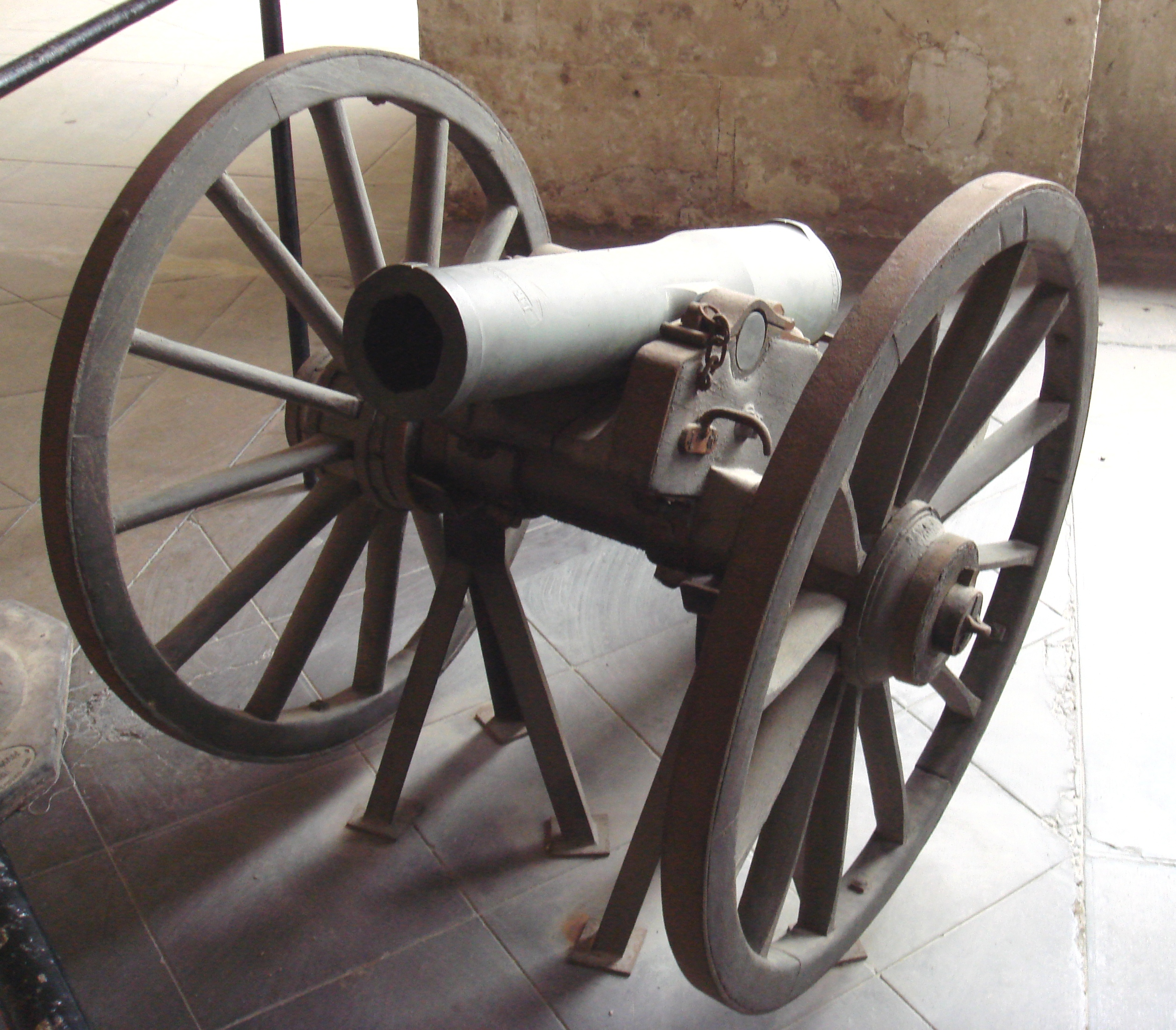
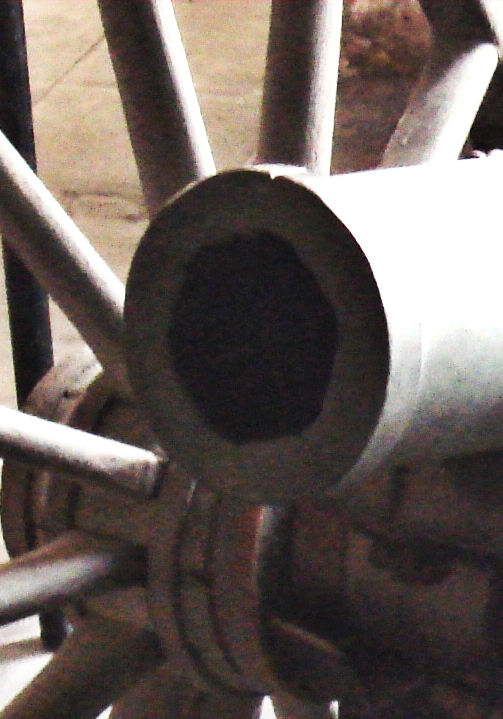
Rifled mountain cannon of the French La Hitte system, "Canon de montagne de 4 modèle 1859 Le Pétulant". Caliber: 86 mm. Length: 0.82 m. Mass: 101 kg (208 kg with carriage). Ammunition: 4 kg shell. Its hexagonal rifling is shown in detail.

The principle of the polygonal barrel was proposed in 1853 by Sir Joseph Whitworth, a prominent British engineer and entrepreneur. Whitworth experimented with cannons using twisted hexagonal barrels instead of traditional round rifled barrels and patented the design in 1854. In 1856, this concept was demonstrated in a series of experiments using brass howitzers. The British military, however, rejected Whitworth's polygonal designs. Afterwards, Whitworth adopted the concept on small arms, believing that polygonal rifling could be used to create a more accurate rifled musket to replace the Pattern 1853 Enfield.

During the American Civil War, Whitworth's polygonally rifled Whitworth rifle was successfully used by the Confederate States Army marksmen (known as the Whitworth Sharpshooters) to terrorize Union Army artillery crews. The muzzle-loading Whitworth rifle is often called the "sharpshooter" because of its superior accuracy compared to other rifled muskets of its era (far surpassing the breechloading Sharps rifle used by the Union Army) and is considered one of the earliest examples of a sniper rifle. The Whitworth sharpshooters killed multiple high-ranking Union officers, most famously Major General John Sedgwick, who was fatally shot at a range of 1,000 yards (910 m) during the Battle of Spotsylvania Court House.

The last service rifles to use polygonal rifling were the British Lee–Metford rifles, named after their proprietary Metford rifling, American M1895 Lee Navy rifles (both designed by James Paris Lee), and the Japanese Arisaka rifles designed by Colonel Arisaka and Colonel Nambu. The Lee-Metford rifle turned out to be a failure after the switch to the erosive cordite proved too much for the smooth and shallow Metford rifling, which had been designed to reduce barrel fouling for black powder ammunition. When the Metford rifling design was dropped, the Lee–Metford became the Lee–Enfield rifle in favour of Enfield type rifling, which was deep-grooved for longer service life. Lee Navy shared the same fate since Rifleite adopted for 6 mm Lee Navy was analogous to cordite. However, the Arisaka rifles were manufactured extensively for the Imperial Japanese Army from 1897 to 1945 with no excessive rifling erosion problems, as the Japanese had adopted a better, non-erosive, rifle powder.

During World War II, polygonal rifling emerged again in the German MG 42 general-purpose machine guns, as an outgrowth of a cold-hammer forging process developed by German engineers prior to the outbreak of the war. The process addressed the need to produce large quantities of more durable gun barrels in less time than those produced with traditional methods, as the MG 42's infamously fast rate of fire tended to overheat the barrel quickly and thus warranted frequent barrel changes. The MG 42's successor, the Rheinmetall MG 3 machine gun, can also have polygonal rifling.

Heckler & Koch was the first manufacturer to begin using polygonal rifling in modern small arms like the G3A3 battle rifle and several semi-automatic hunting rifles like the HK SL7. Companies that utilize this method today include Tanfoglio, Heckler & Koch, Glock (Gen 1-4), Magnum Research, Česká Zbrojovka, Kahr Arms, Walther and Israel Weapon Industries. Polygonal rifling is usually found only in pistol barrels, and is less common in rifles; however, some extremely high end precision rifles like the Heckler & Koch PSG1 and its Pakistani variant PSR-90, and the LaRue Tactical Stealth System sniper rifle use polygonal bores.

== Design ==
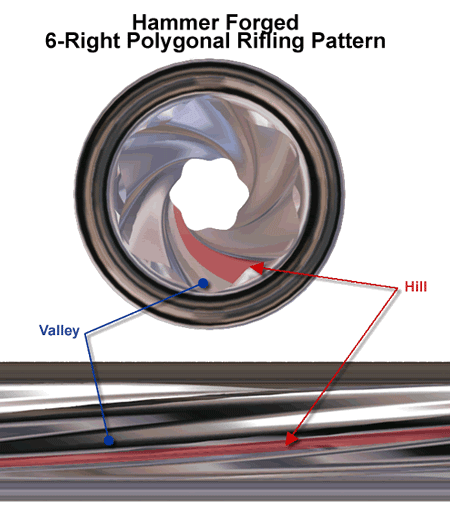
Hexagonal polygonal rifling.

A number of advantages are claimed by the supporters of polygonal rifling. These include:

- Not compromising the barrel's thickness in the area of each groove as with traditional rifling, and also less sensitive to stress concentration-induced barrel failure.
- Providing a better gas seal around the projectile as polygonal bores tend to have shallower, smoother edges with a slightly smaller bore area, which translates into more efficient seal of the combustion gases trapped behind the bullet, slightly greater (consistency in) muzzle velocities and slightly increased accuracy.
- Less bullet deformation, resulting in less frictional resistance when the bullet travels through the barrel, which helps to increase muzzle velocity. The lack of sharp surface deformation on the bullet (rifling marks) also reduces drag in flight.
- Reduced buildup of copper or lead within the barrel, as there are no sharp rifling edges to "shred" into the bullet surface and no pronounced corners that can accumulate foulings difficult to clean, which results in easier maintenance. The reduced fouling also theoretically translates to a simpler "copper equilibrium" profile, which is potentially beneficial to accuracy.
- Prolonged barrel life, as the thermomechanical stress upon the riflings are spread over a larger area, hence less wear over time.

However, precision target pistols such as those used in Bullseye and IHMSA almost universally use traditional rifling, as do target rifles. The debate among target shooters is almost always one of cut vs. button rifled barrels, as traditional rifling is dominant. Polygonal rifled barrels are used competitively in pistol action shooting, such as IDPA and IPSC competitions.

Part of the difference may be that most polygonal rifling is produced by hammer forging the barrel around a mandrel containing a reverse impression of the rifling. Hammer forging machines are tremendously expensive, far out of the reach of custom gunsmiths (unless they buy pre-rifled blanks), and so are generally only used for production barrels by large companies. The main advantage of a hammer forging process is that it can rifle, chamber, and contour a bored barrel blank in one step. First applied to rifling in Germany in 1939, hammer forging has remained popular in Europe but was only later used by gunmakers in the United States. The hammer forging process produces large amounts of stress in the barrel that must be relieved by careful heat treatment, a process that is less necessary in a traditionally cut or button rifled barrel. Due to the potential for residual stress causing accuracy problems, precision shooters in the United States tend to avoid hammer forged barrels, and this limits them in the type of available rifling. From a practical standpoint, any accuracy issues resulting from the residual stresses of hammer forging are extremely unlikely to be an issue in a defense or service pistol, or a typical hunting rifle.

== Variations ==
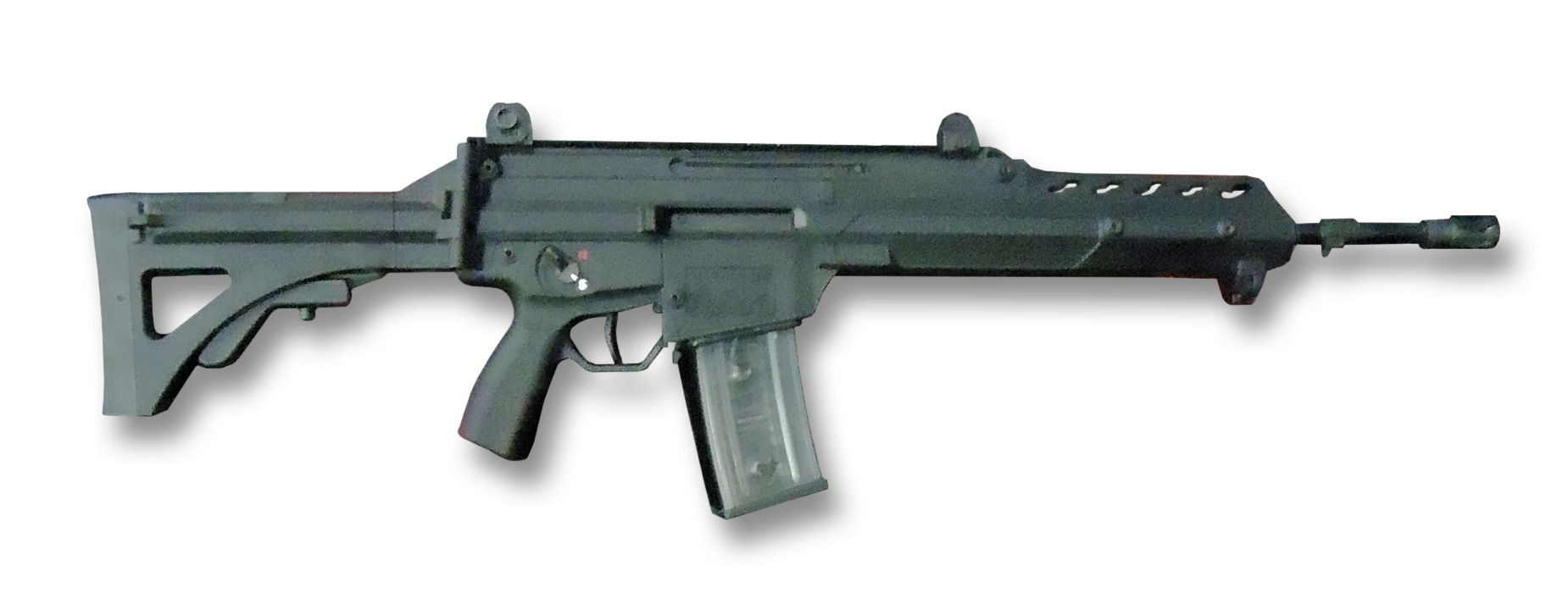
The FX-05 Xiuhcoatl is an example of an assault rifle that uses polygonal rifling.

Different manufacturers employ varying polygonal rifling profiles. H&K, CZ and Glock use a female type of polygonal rifling. This type has a smaller bore area than the male type of polygonal rifling designed and used by Lothar Walther. Other companies such as Noveske Rifleworks (Pac Nor) and LWRC use a rifling more like the conventional rifling, with both of each land's sides being sloped but having a flat top and defined corners; this type of rifling is more a canted land type of rifling than polygonal rifling.

== Forensic examination ==
Polygonal rifling prevents the forensic firearms examiner from microscopically measuring the width of land and groove impressions (so-called "ballistic fingerprinting") because the polygonal riflings have a rounded profile instead of well-defined rectangular edges, which causes few noticeable surface deformations. In the FBI GRC file, the land and groove widths for these firearms are listed as 0.000. However, forensic identification of firearms (in court cases, etc.) is based on microscopic examination of tooling marks on the surface of the bore, produced by the manufacturing process and modified by the drag of bullet jackets on that same surface. Thus, the bore surface of individual firearms is always unique.

== See also ==
- Smoothbore
