= Target circle =

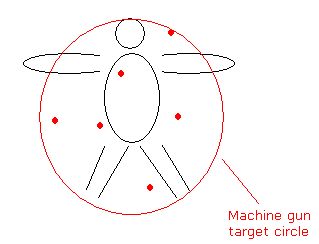
Target circle of a machine gun used on a dummy

A target circle is the area in front of a firearm within which that firearm might impact. The smaller the target circle, the greater the firearm's accuracy.
