= Whitworth rifle =

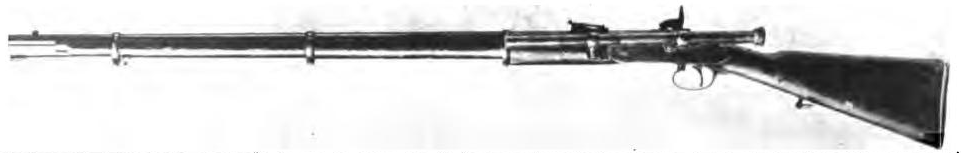
- Type: Muzzle-loading rifle
- Place of origin: United Kingdom

Service history
- Used by: United Kingdom; Canada; Australia; New Zealand; Confederate States of America
- Wars: American Civil War, Australian frontier wars, New Zealand wars

Production history
- Designer: Joseph Whitworth
- Designed: 1854–1857
- Manufacturer: Whitworth Rifle Company
- Produced: 1857–1865
- No. built: 13,400

Specifications
- Length: 49 in (1,200 mm)
- Barrel length: 33 in (840 mm)
- Calibre: 0.451 in (11.5 mm)
- Action: Percussion lock
- Rate of fire: 2–3 rounds per minute
- Effective firing range: 800 to 1,000 yd (730 to 910 m)
- Maximum firing range: 1,500 yd (1,400 m)
- Feed system: Muzzle-loaded
- Sights: Classic iron sights, Scope

The Whitworth rifle was an English-made percussion cap rifled musket used in the latter half of the 19th century. A single-shot muzzleloader with excellent long-range accuracy for its era, especially when used with a telescopic sight, the Whitworth rifle was widely regarded as the world's first sniper rifle.

The Whitworth rifle saw extensive use with the Confederate sharpshooters in the American Civil War, claiming the lives of several Union generals, including Major General John Sedgwick, one of the highest-ranking Union officers killed during the Civil War, shot on 9 May 1864, at Spotsylvania. In October 2017, a surviving example of a Confederate Whitworth rifle was auctioned with a hammer price of $161,000.

The Whitworth rifle was considered to be the very best rifle of its time in terms of accuracy, when compared to other British, French, American rifles, or those produced elsewhere.

== History ==
The Whitworth rifle was designed by Sir Joseph Whitworth, a prominent British engineer and entrepreneur. Whitworth had experimented with cannons using polygonal rifling instead of traditional rifled barrels, which was patented in 1854. The hexagonal polygonal rifling meant that the projectile did not have to bite into grooves as was done with conventional rifling. In 1856, that concept was demonstrated in a series of experiments using brass howitzers. Joseph works with Charles Lancaster and Westley Richards. It given same testing trial as Brunswick rifles.

Whitworth believed that the same type of system could be used to create a more accurate rifle to replace the Pattern 1853 Enfield, which had shown some weaknesses during the recent Crimean War. Trials were held in 1857 to compare Whitworth's design against the Enfield. The Whitworth rifle outperformed the Enfield at a rate of about three to one in the trials, which tested the accuracy and range of both weapons. Notably, the Whitworth rifle was able to hit the target at a range of 2,000 yards (1,800 m), whereas the Enfield was only able to hit the same target at a range of 1,400 yards (1,300 m).

While the trials were generally a success for the Whitworth rifle, the British government ultimately rejected the design because the Whitworth's barrel was much more prone to fouling than the Enfield, and the Whitworth rifle also cost approximately four times as much to manufacture. The Whitworth Rifle Company was able to sell the weapon to the French army, and also to the Confederacy during the American Civil War.

== Design and features ==
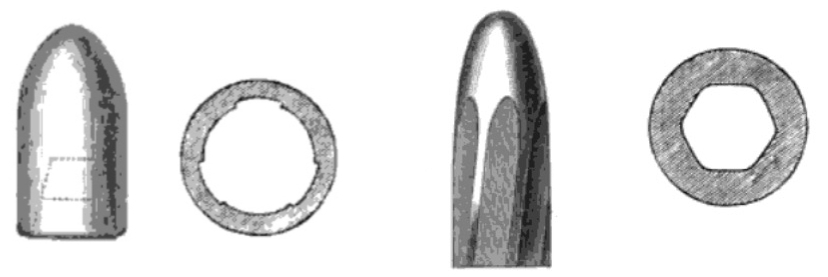
Period diagram comparing the Pattern 1853 Enfield (left) with the Whitworth rifle (right), which uses a hexagonal bore and matching bullet.

While the barrel design of the Whitworth rifle was innovative, the rest of the rifle was similar to other rifles and rifle-muskets used at the time. The rifle was muzzle loaded, and used a percussion lock firing mechanism. The lock mechanism was very similar to that used on the Enfield rifle-musket.

Whitworth chose to use a longer and more slender bullet than was common at the time, which resulted in a bore diameter of .451 inches (11.5 mm) caliber, significantly smaller than the Enfield's .577-inch (14.7 mm) caliber bore. Whitworth's bullets were more stable at longer ranges than the shorter and larger diameter bullets found in other rifles of the time. Soon .577 calibre was called "fullbore", and .451, used extensively in long range shooting sport, "smallbore". Whitworth also engineered the barrel with a 1-in-20-inch (510 mm) twist, quite a bit tighter than the 1-in-78-inch (2,000 mm) of the 1853 Enfield, or the later 1856/1858 variants with five-groove barrels and a 1-in-48-inch (1,200 mm) twist. The extra spin the tighter twist imparted to the projectile further stabilized the bullet in flight.

The Whitworth rifle weighed 9 lb (4.1 kg). Other long-range rifles of the period tended to have much larger and heavier barrels, which made them too heavy for standard infantry use.

When being used by sharpshooters, Whitworth rifles were usually rested against a tree or log to increase their accuracy. Some sharpshooters carried their own forked rests for the rifle, so that a suitable rest was always available.

Whitworth bayonets are nearly identical to the 1856 Enfield bayonet, with the exception of the circular mortise slot, chequered leather slab grips, and a yataghan-type single-fullered blade, featuring issue markings on both ricassos and the spine, including a crowned VR.

== Use ==
In 1860, the British National Rifle Association held its first annual meeting at Wimbledon. Queen Victoria fired the first shot from a Whitworth rifle on a machine rest at 400 yards (370 m), and struck the bull's-eye 1 to 1 1/4 inches (25–32 mm) from its center.

Britain was officially neutral during the American Civil War, but private arms manufacturers were not required to remain neutral. The Whitworth Rifle Company, for example, sold the rifle to the Confederacy. The Confederate soldiers that used these rifles were referred to as Whitworth Sharpshooters. They accompanied regular infantrymen, and were usually used to eliminate Union artillery gun crews. The M1863 saber bayonets integrated into the Confederate army.

The Whitworth was held responsible for at least two deaths of high-ranking officers. On 19 September 1863, at the Battle of Chickamauga, an unnamed Confederate sharpshooter mortally wounded Union General William Lytle, who was leading a charge at the time.

Later in the war, on 9 May 1864, during the Battle of Spotsylvania Courthouse, according to popular accounts, Union General John Sedgwick was chiding some of his troops for lying down in a ditch to avoid Confederate sharpshooters at a range of around 800 to 1,000 yards (730–910 m). Shots from Confederate Whitworth rifles, easily identifiable due to the shrill whistling noises their hexagonal bullets made in flight, caused members of his staff and nearby artillerymen to duck for cover. Sedgwick strode around in the open and was quoted as saying, "What? Men dodging this way for single bullets? What will you do when they open fire along the whole line? I am ashamed of you. They couldn't hit an elephant at this distance." Although chastened, his men continued to flinch and he repeated, "I'm ashamed of you, dodging that way. They couldn't hit an elephant at this distance." Just seconds later he fell forward with a bullet hole below his left eye. At least five Confederate soldiers claimed that they had fired the fatal shot.

The Whitworth rifle with a hexagonal bore and rapid regular twist, when it was tested by the Union's Ordnance Committee, along with the

- Lancaster rifle with a smooth elliptical bore and an increasing twist;
- Westley Richards' breech loader with a Whitworth barrel; and the
- Enfield rifle of five grooves and regular twist of one turn in forty three inches;

It was admitted to have surpassed all the others for accuracy at long ranges. No less than 1,000 rounds were fired from each rifle without cleaning. But as it required "...very peculiar long cartridges, it was thought these would be inconvenient for army purposes."

== Variants ==
Whitworth rifles were made with barrel lengths of 33, 36 and 39 inches (840, 910 and 990 mm), giving the weapon an overall length of 49, 52 and 55 inches (1,200, 1,300 and 1,400 mm) respectively. The barrel was attached to the stock using two or three barrel bands, depending on the barrel's length.

Two types of bullets were used in the Whitworth rifle: hexagonal and cylindrical. The cylindrical bullets had to be made out of soft pure lead, with a small hollow in the base. Under the influence of the deflagration of 80 to 90 grains (5.2–5.8 g) of fine rifle powder, the bullet would obturate into the hexagonal bore. Recovered bullets were found to be as hexagonal as those which had been factory-made to a hexagonal shape. The hexagonal-form bullet did not need to expand to properly grip the barrel, and therefore could be made out of a harder lead alloy.

The sights used on Whitworth rifles varied. Some used Enfield type flip-up sights that were graduated to 1,200 yards (1,100 m) in 100 yards (90 m) increments. Others used a sliding blade sight with an adjustment for windage. Some had simple fixed front sights, while others used a post and globe front sight. A small number of Whitworth rifles were equipped with a four power telescopic sight, designed by British Colonel David Davidson which, unlike modern rifle scopes, was attached to the left side of the weapon instead of the top. While the telescopic sight was very advanced for its time, it had a reputation for leaving the user with a black eye due to the rifle's fairly substantial recoil.

The typical Confederate rifle and short rifle variant in the U.S. Civil War had a barrel length of 33 inches (840 mm), open sights with the front blade being adjustable for windage, and a stock which extended to within a short distance of the muzzle, giving the rifle a snub-nosed appearance.

== Modern use ==
Previously, reproductions of Whitworth rifles were manufactured by Parker-Hale and Euroarms. In September 2015, Italian manufacturer Davide Pedersoli began the modern reproduction of Whitworth rifles. These reproductions are often used by Confederate re-enactors of the American Civil War, and by those who have an interest in muzzleloading firearms. All variants used in the American Civil War were "two-band" with 33-inch (840 mm) barrels, while, as of 2022, the reproduction rifles are all the longer-barreled, "three-band", civilian versions of the famed rifle. Many riflemen enjoy using them in target shooting competitions at ranges up to 1,000 yards (910 m).

== See also ==
- British military rifles
- Rifles in the American Civil War
