= John Sedgwick =

American teacher, military officer, and Union Army general (1813–1864)

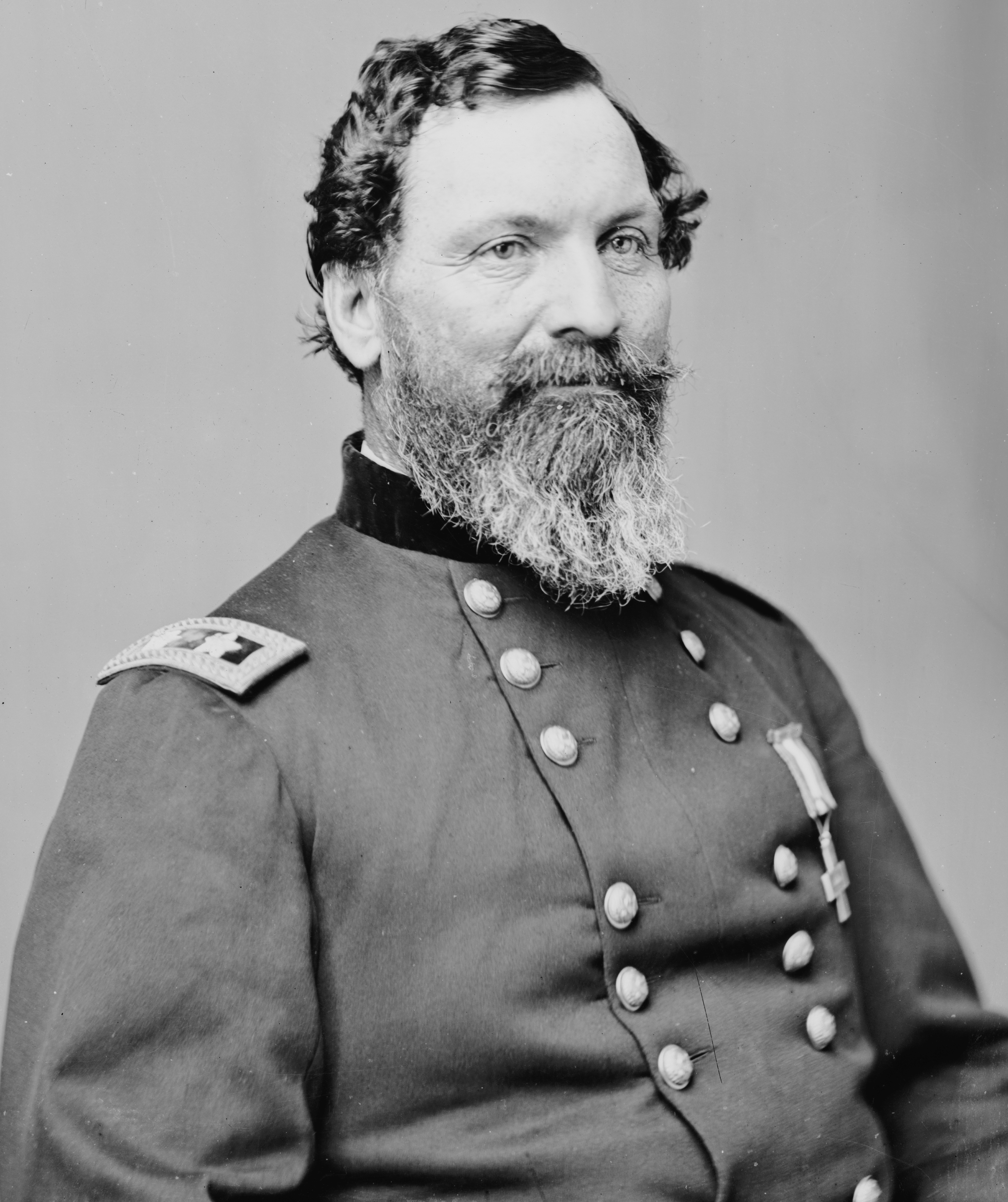
- Sedgwick in the 1860s
- Born: September 13, 1813; Cornwall, Connecticut, U.S.
- Died: May 9, 1864 (aged 50); Spotsylvania County, Virginia, U.S.
- Cause of death: Gunshot wound
- Burial place: Cornwall Hollow Cemetery (Cornwall, Connecticut)
- Military career
- Allegiance: United States
- Branch: United States Army (Union Army)
- Service years: 1837–1864
- Rank: Major general
- Nickname: "Uncle John"
- Commands: VI Corps
- Conflicts: Seminole Wars; Mexican–American War; Utah War; Indian Wars; American Civil War †
- Other work: Teacher

John Sedgwick (September 13, 1813 – May 9, 1864) was an American military officer who served as a major general in the Union Army during the American Civil War. He was one of the highest-ranking Union officers to be killed in the war, along with Major Generals James B. McPherson, Joseph K. Mansfield and John F. Reynolds.

Sedgwick was wounded three times at the Battle of Antietam while leading his division in an unsuccessful assault against the Confederate Army, causing him to miss the Battle of Fredericksburg. Under his command, the VI Corps played an important role in the Chancellorsville Campaign by engaging Confederate troops at the Second Battle of Fredericksburg and the Battle of Salem Church. His corps was the last to arrive at the Battle of Gettysburg and did not see much action. Sedgwick was killed at the Battle of Spotsylvania Court House on May 9, 1864 by a long-range shot from a Whitworth sharpshooter, and is remembered for an ironic remark among his last words: "They couldn't hit an elephant at this distance."

== Early life and education ==
Sedgwick was born in the Litchfield Hills town of Cornwall, Connecticut. He was named after his grandfather, John Sedgwick (brother of Theodore Sedgwick), who was lieutenant colonel of the 14th Regiment of Connecticut Militia during the American Revolutionary War. He attended Sharon Academy for 2 years and Cheshire Academy in 1830–31. After teaching for two years, he attended the United States Military Academy, graduated in 1837 ranked 24th of 50, and was commissioned as a second lieutenant in the U.S. Army's artillery branch. He fought in the Seminole Wars and received two brevet promotions in the Mexican–American War, to captain for the battles of Contreras and Churubusco, and to major for the battle of Chapultepec. After returning from Mexico, he was promoted to the permanent rank of captain in 1849 and replaced James Duncan as commander of Battery A, 2nd U.S. Artillery. In March 1855, Sedgwick accepted a transfer promotion to the rank of major with the United States Cavalry. He served in Kansas, in the Utah War, and in the Indian Wars, participating during 1857 in a punitive expedition against the Cheyenne.

In the summer and fall of 1860, Sedgwick commanded an expedition to establish a new fort on the Platte River in what is now Colorado. This was a remote location with no railroads, and all supplies having to be carried long distances by riverboat, wagon train or horseback. Even though many of these supplies failed to arrive, Sedgwick still managed to erect comfortable stone buildings for his men before the cold weather set in.

== American Civil War ==
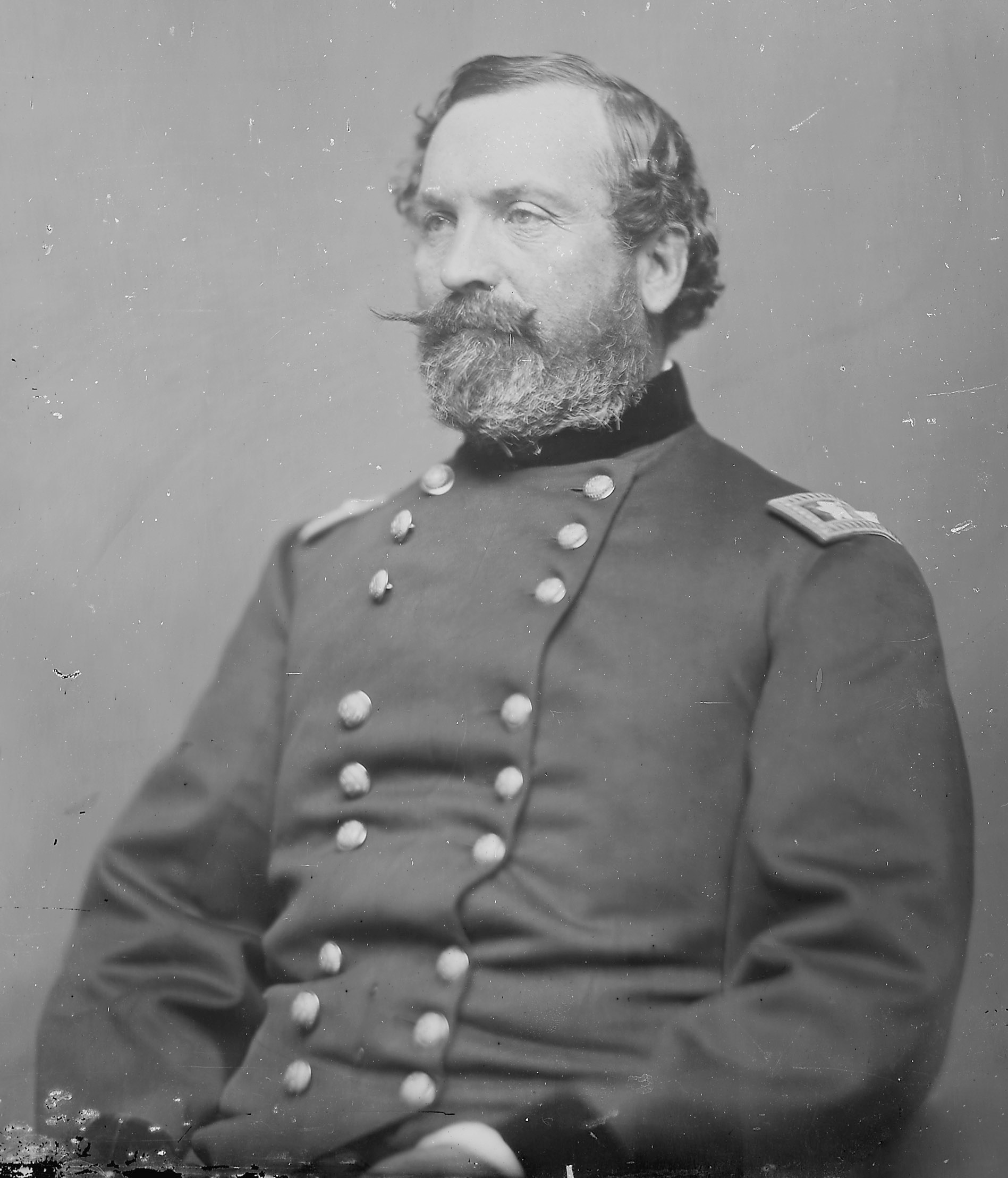
Sedgwick during the Civil War

At the start of the American Civil War, Sedgwick was serving as a colonel and assistant inspector general of the Military Department of Washington. He missed the early action of the war at the First Battle of Bull Run while recovering from cholera. Promoted to brigadier general on August 31, 1861, he commanded the 2nd brigade of major general Samuel P. Heintzelman's division in the Army of the Potomac, then his own division, which was designated the 2nd division of the II Corps for the Peninsula campaign. In Virginia, Sedgwick fought at Yorktown and Seven Pines. During the Seven Days Battles, Sedgwick's division fought at Savage's Station and Glendale, being wounded in the latter engagement. After the Seven Days Battles, he was promoted to major general. The II Corps and Sedgwick's division were not involved in the Northern Virginia campaign.

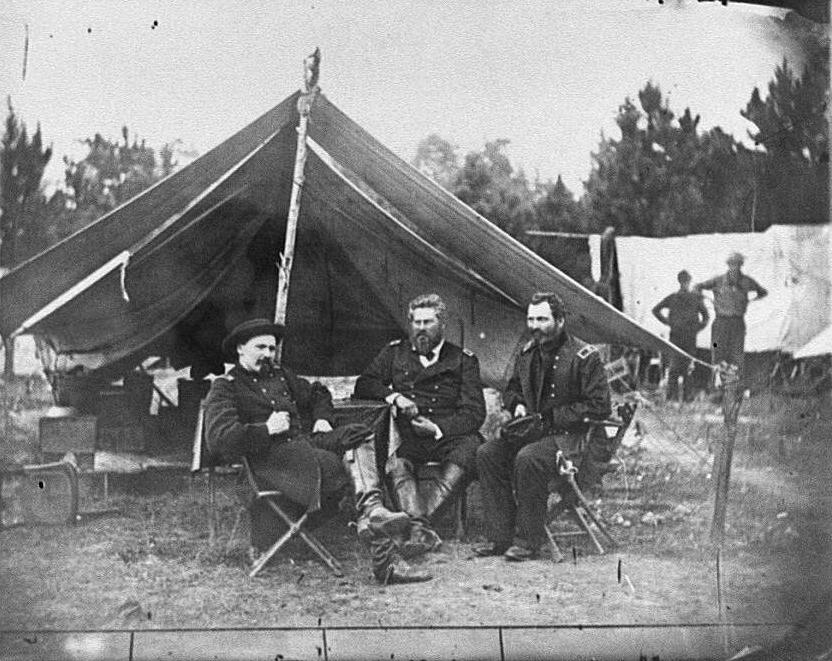
General Sedgwick (seated right) with Colonels Albert V. Colburn and Delos B. Sackett in Harrison's Landing, Virginia, during the Peninsula Campaign in 1862.

In the Battle of Antietam, II Corps commander major general Edwin Vose Sumner impulsively sent Sedgwick's division into a mass assault without proper reconnaissance. His division was engaged by Confederate forces under major general Thomas J. "Stonewall" Jackson from three sides, was routed, and fell back with barely half the men it had started with. Sedgwick himself was shot three times, in the wrist, leg, and shoulder, and was out of action until after the Battle of Fredericksburg.

From December 26, 1862, Sedgwick briefly led the II Corps and the IX Corps, and then finally the VI Corps of the Army of the Potomac, which he commanded until his death in 1864. During the Second Battle of Fredericksburg, his corps faced Fredericksburg in an initial holding action while major general Joseph Hooker's other four corps maneuvered against Robert E. Lee's left flank (10 miles west at Chancellorsville). Sedgwick was slow to take action, but eventually crossed the Rappahannock River and assaulted major general Jubal Early's small force on Marye's Heights on May 3. Moving slowly to join forces with Hooker and trap Lee between the halves of the army, he was stopped by elements of Lee's Second Corps (under major general J. E. B. Stuart, following the wounding of Jackson) at the Battle of Salem Church, forcing his eventual retreat back over the Rappahannock.

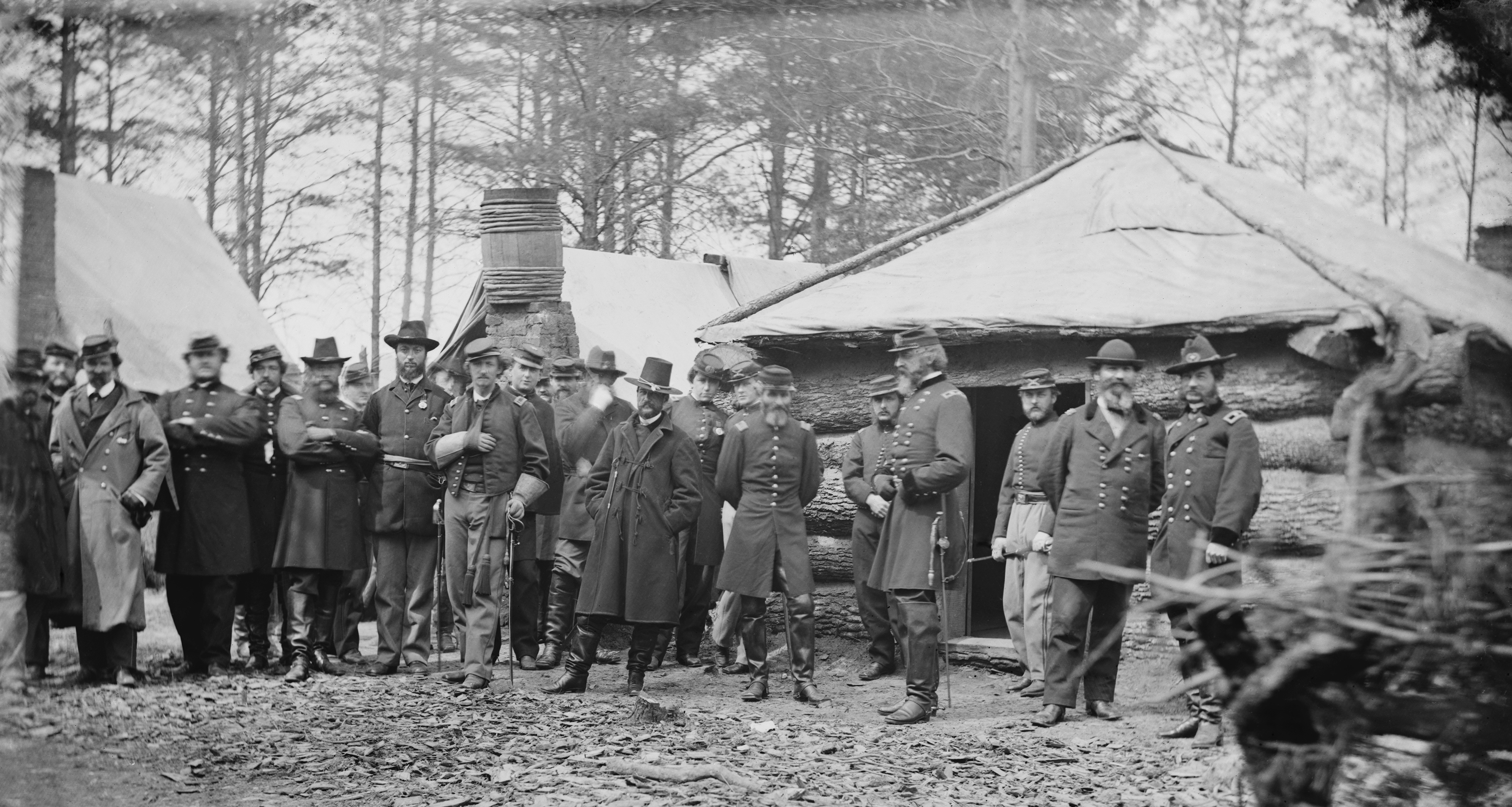
Horse artillery headquarters in Brandy Station, Virginia, February 1864. Sedgwick stands at the far right between Generals George G. Meade and Alfred Torbert, along with staff officers.

At the Battle of Gettysburg, Sedgwick's corps arrived late on July 2, and as a result only a few units of his corps were able to take part in the final Union counterattacks in the Wheatfield. It was not kept together as a unit during the second and third days of the battle, its brigades scattered around to plug holes in the line. While much of Sedgwick's VI Corps was held in reserve at Gettysburg, it performed exceptionally at the Second Battle of Rappahannock Station in November, capturing four field pieces, eight stands of enemy colors, and 1,700 prisoners.

Prior to the start of the Overland Campaign in the spring of 1864, George Meade reorganized the Army of the Potomac and dropped several underperforming generals. Sedgwick narrowly missed the chopping block, being unpopular with Secretary of War Edwin Stanton for being a vocal admirer of departed Army of the Potomac commander George B. McClellan and having shown insufficient enthusiasm for abolitionism and the Radical Republican platform. Sedgwick had also made enemies among the Radical Republicans by criticizing General Benjamin Butler, one of their favorites. Meade, realizing this, proposed reassigning Sedgwick to command in the Shenandoah Valley. Sedgwick himself acknowledged that he was war-weary by this point and would have welcomed reassignment to a post where not much fighting was expected. In a letter to his sister, he said that he could gladly leave the army without regret and wished to come home to New England. In the end, however, General Franz Sigel got the Shenandoah Valley command, which ended up being a much more active theater in 1864 than anyone expected, and Sedgwick remained in command of the VI Corps.

In the Overland Campaign, the VI Corps was on the Union right at the Battle of the Wilderness and defended against assaults by Lt. Gen. Richard S. Ewell's Second Corps.

=== Death ===
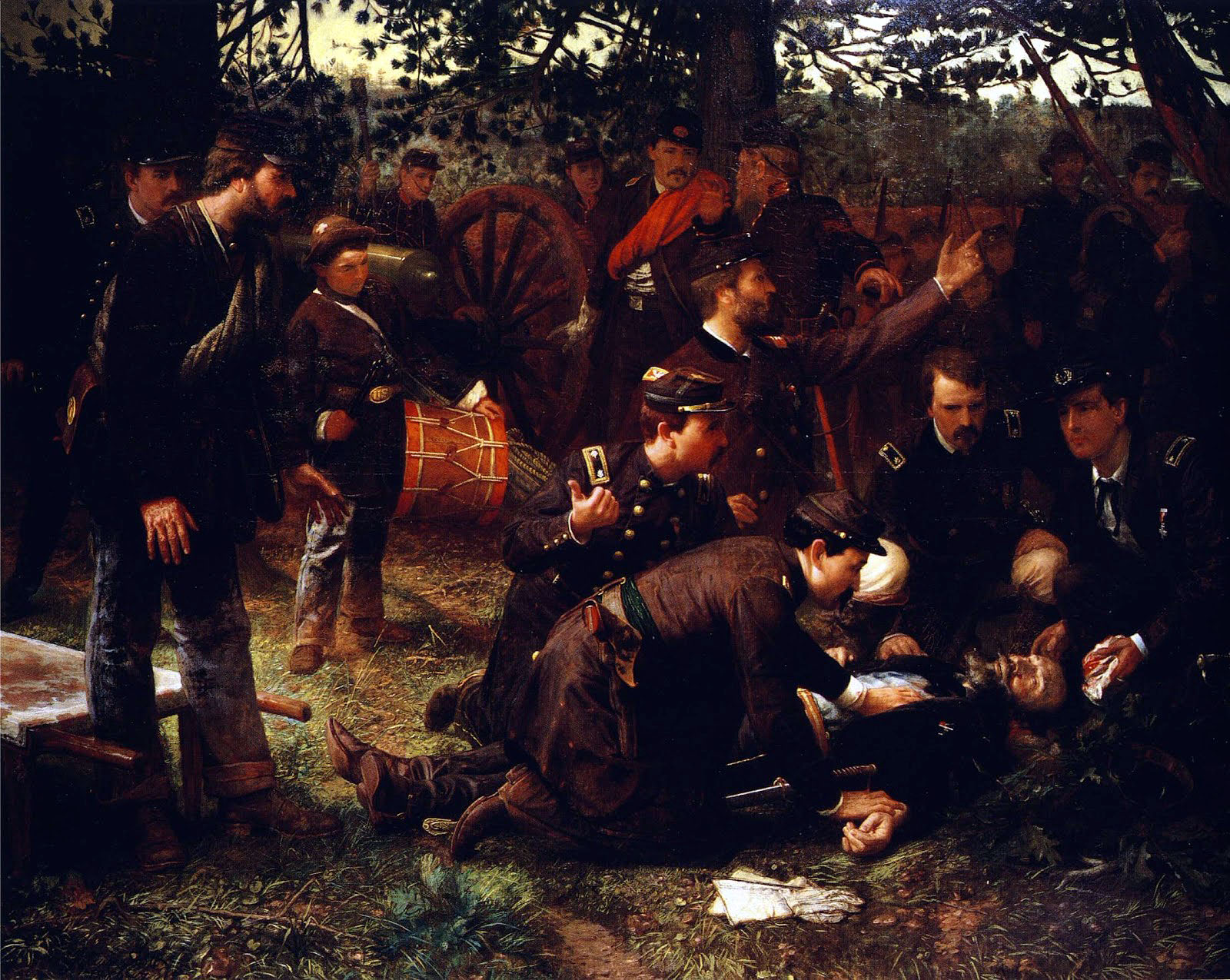
The Death of General Sedgwick by Julian Scott

Sedgwick died at the beginning of the Battle of Spotsylvania Court House, on May 9, 1864. His corps was probing skirmish lines ahead of the left flank of Confederate defenses, and he was directing artillery placements. Confederate sharpshooters were about 1,000 yards (900 m) away, and their shots caused members of his staff, infantrymen from the 87th Pennsylvania and 14th New Jersey, and artillerymen from the 1st Massachusetts, to duck for cover. Sedgwick strode around in the open and was quoted as saying, "What? Men dodging this way for single bullets? What will you do when they open fire along the whole line?" Although ashamed, his men continued to flinch, and he said, "Why are you dodging like this? They couldn't hit an elephant at this distance."

Reports that Sedgwick never finished the sentence are apocryphal, although the sentence was certainly among his last words. He was shot by a Whitworth rifle bullet moments later under the left eye and mortally wounded. His chief of staff Martin T. McMahon said that sharpshooters' bullets were flying around making whistling noises, and that "the same shrill whistle closing with a dull, heavy stroke interrupted me, and I remember distinctly that I commenced to say 'General, they are firing explosive bullets.' when his face turned slowly to me, and blood spurting from his left cheek under the eye in a steady stream, brought to me the first knowledge of our great disaster. He fell in my direction and I was so close to him that my effort to support him failed, and I went to the ground with him." Corps medical personnel were immediately summoned, but Sedgwick never regained consciousness and continued to bleed out until his hair was soaked with blood. (Note: According to Rhea, the preeminent historian of the Overland Campaign, pp. 93–96, there is no record of the identity or location of the sharpshooter. Union troops from the 6th Vermont claim to have shot an unidentified sharpshooter as they crossed the fields seeking revenge. Ben Powell of the 12th South Carolina claimed credit, although his account has been discounted because the general he shot at with a Whitworth rifle was mounted, probably Brig Gen. William H. Morris. Thomas Burgess of the 15th South Carolina has also been cited by some veterans.)

Sedgwick was the highest-ranking general officer in the US Volunteers to be killed in the war. Although Major General James B. McPherson was in command of an army at the time of his death and Sedgwick only of a corps, Sedgwick had the most senior rank by date of all major generals killed. However, McPherson was a brigadier general in the Regular Army and outranked Sedgwick, who was a colonel. Upon hearing of his death, Lieutenant General Ulysses S. Grant, shocked by the news, reportedly asked of Sedgwick "is he really dead?"

== Legacy ==
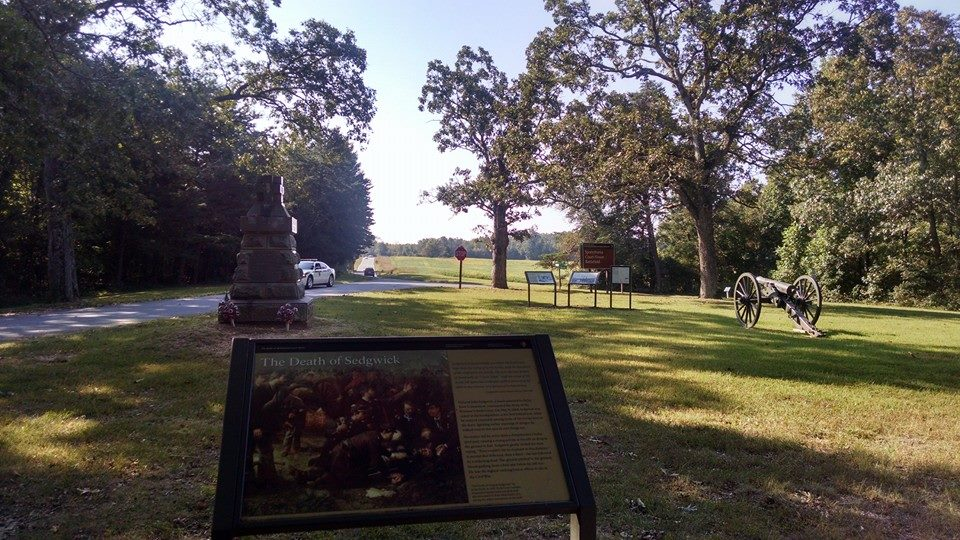
Monument to commemorate the death of General John Sedgwick at Spotsylvania National Military Park, Virginia

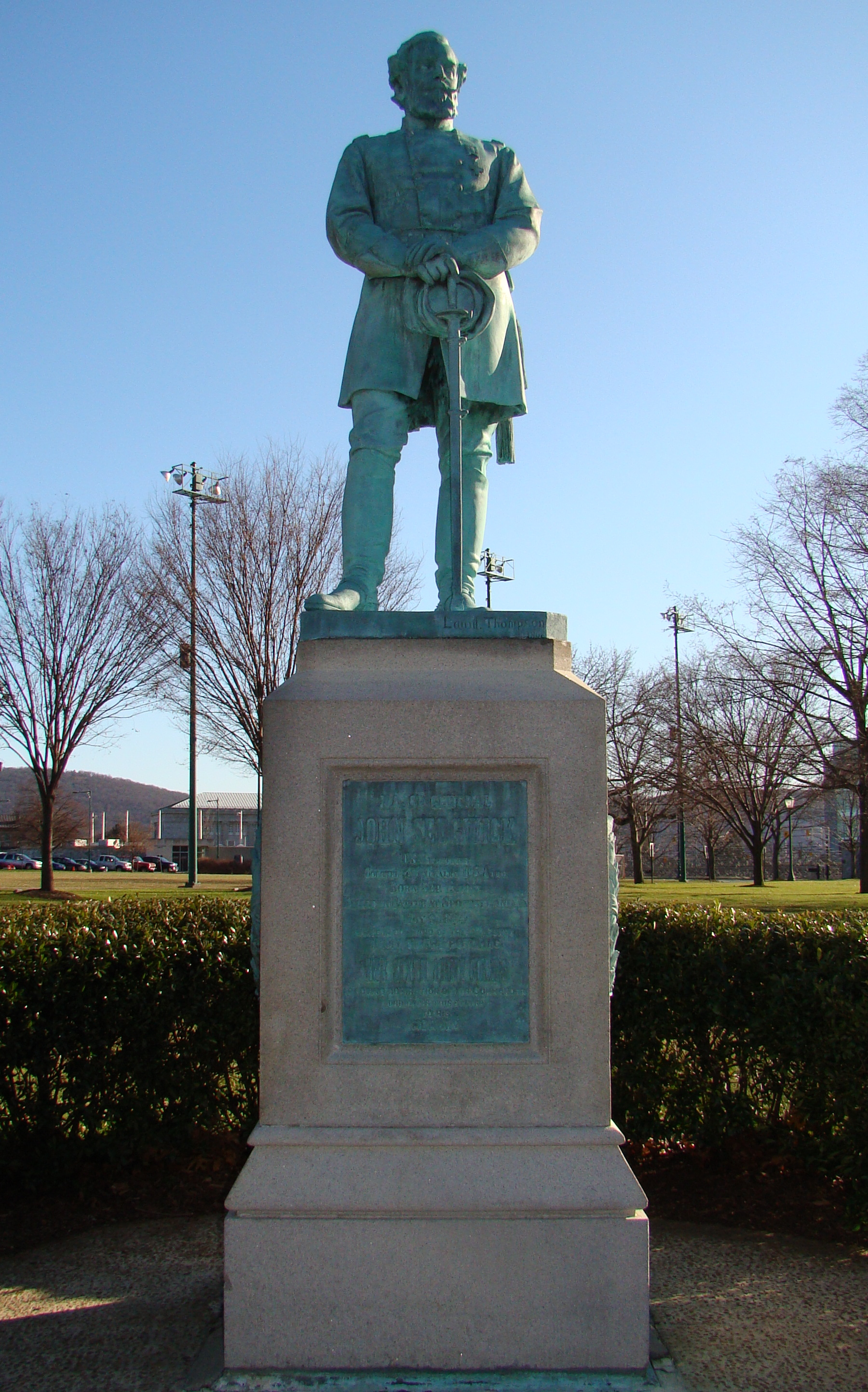
A statue of General Sedgwick at West Point

Sedgwick's reputation was that of a solid, dependable, but relatively unaggressive general. He was well-liked by his soldiers, who referred to him affectionately as "Uncle John". His death was met by universal sorrow; even Robert E. Lee expressed his sadness over the fate of an old friend. George Meade wept at the news. Meade had recently quarreled with Sedgwick for being over-reliant on fellow corps commander Gouverneur K. Warren for advice, and said of him "I wish we could have parted on better terms." Ulysses S. Grant characterized Sedgwick as one who "was never at fault when serious work was to be done" and told his staff that the loss of Sedgwick was for him worse than that of an entire division.

Sedgwick is buried near his birthplace of Cornwall Hollow, Connecticut. An equestrian statue honors him and the VI Corps at Gettysburg National Military Park.

There is a monument of Sedgwick at West Point. Academy legend has it that a cadet who spins the rowels of the spurs on the boots of the statue at midnight while wearing full parade dress gray over white uniform under arms will have good luck on their final exam.

The following were named in his honor:

- Sedgwick, Colorado
- Sedgwick County, Colorado
- Sedgwick, Kansas
- Sedgwick County, Kansas
- Fort Sedgwick was one of the forts of the Union siege line in the Siege of Petersburg 1864–65.
- Camp Rankin was renamed Fort Sedgwick in 1865, near Julesburg, Colorado.

Sedgwick Avenue, a major street in the Bronx, New York City, is named after Sedgwick. An east–west street in Washington, D.C., near American University, is also named in his honor, as is another on Chicago's near north side, with a CTA station named after the street. Grand Army of the Republic Post #4 in Keene, New Hampshire; Post #12 in Milwaukee, Wisconsin; Post #17 in Santa Ana, California; and Post #37 in York, Pennsylvania, are all named after him. A junior high school, John Sedgwick Middle School, in Port Orchard, Washington, was named after him.

Farley, Sedgwick's home and headquarters at the time of the Battle of Brandy Station, was listed on the National Register of Historic Places in 1976.

== See also ==
- List of American Civil War generals (Union)

== Citations ==
References

- Berthrong, Donald J. The Southern Cheyenne. Norman: University of Oklahoma Press, 1979. OCLC 254915143
- Eicher, John H., and David J. Eicher. Civil War High Commands. Stanford, CA: Stanford University Press, 2001. ISBN 0-8047-3641-3.
- Foote, Shelby. The Civil War: A Narrative. vol. 3, Red River to Appomattox. New York: Random House, 1974. ISBN 0-394-74913-8.
- Grinnell, George Bird. The Fighting Cheyennes. Norman: University of Oklahoma Press, 1956. OCLC 419857. First published 1915 by Charles Scribner's Sons.
- Jurgen, Robert J., and Allan Keller. Major General John Sedgwick, U.S. Volunteers, 1813–1864. Hartford: Connecticut Civil War Centennial Committee, 1963.
- Rhea, Gordon C. The Battles for Spotsylvania Court House and the Road to Yellow Tavern May 7–12, 1864. Baton Rouge: Louisiana State University Press, 1997. ISBN 0-8071-2136-3.
- Sifakis, Stewart. Who Was Who In The Civil War. New York: Facts on File, 1988. ISBN 0-8160-1055-2.
- Winslow, Richard Elliott. General John Sedgwick: The Story of a Union Corps Commander. Novato, CA: Presidio Press, 1982. ISBN 0-89141-030-9.

Preceded by Darius N. Couch	Commander of the II Corps; December 26, 1862 – January 26, 1863	Succeeded by Oliver O. Howard
Preceded by Orlando B. Wilcox	Commander of the IX Corps; January 16, 1863 – February 5, 1863	Succeeded by William F. Smith
Preceded by John Newton; James B. Ricketts	Commander of the VI Corps; February 5, 1863 – April 3, 1864; April 13, 1864 – May 9, 1864	Succeeded by James B. Ricketts; Horatio Wright
