= Whitworth Sharpshooters =

American Confederate Army riflemen

Whitworth Sharpshooters were the Confederate equivalent to the Union sharpshooter regiments, named for their usage of the imported British Whitworth rifle. These sharpshooters served as skirmishers accompanying regular infantry regiments, and their main task was usually to neutralize or suppress Union field artillery crew that threatened Confederate positions.

== Whitworth rifle ==
The Whitworth rifle proved to be an accurate and deadly instrument. Its most remembered act was on May 9, 1864, at the Battle of Spotsylvania Court House, where Union General John Sedgwick urged his men to leave a ditch in which they lay in order to cover from the Confederate snipers hidden 800 to 1000 yards away. According to Martin T. McMahon, Brevet Major-General, U.S.V. [Chief-of-Staff, Sixth Corps], he and General Sedgwick were walking along the line when he [Sedgwick] noticed a soldier dodging a near-passing bullet, and said to him "What? Men dodging this way for single bullets? What will you do when they open fire along the whole line? I am ashamed of you. I'm ashamed of you, dodging that way. They couldn't hit an elephant at this distance." Seconds later he fell forward with a bullet hole below his left eye. (Note: According to Rhea, the pre-eminent historian of the Overland Campaign, there is no record of the identity or location of the sharpshooter. Union troops from the 6th Vermont claim to have shot an unidentified sharpshooter as they crossed the fields seeking revenge. Ben Powell of the 12th South Carolina claimed credit, although his account has been discounted because the general he shot at with a Whitworth rifled musket was mounted, probably Brig Gen. William H. Morris. Thomas Burgess of the 15th South Carolina has also been cited by some veterans.)
