= List of monuments at the United States Military Academy =

USMA Crest

The United States Military Academy (USMA) is a federal service academy located at West Point, New York that educates and commissions officers for the United States Army. The Academy was formally founded in 1802 and graduated its first class in October of the same year. It is the oldest of the five American service academies. Due to the academy's age and its unique purpose of producing Army officers, it is home to many monuments and memorials, the oldest dating back to the early 19th century, shortly after the academy's founding. The oldest monument is the Cadet Monument, dedicated in 1818 and located in the West Point Cemetery, while the newest is the US Grant statue, located across from Battle Monument and dedicated in 2019.

== Monuments ==
Monument	Image	Dedicated	Description	Reference
Air Cadet Monument		1945	Dedicated by members of the Corps of Cadets to their comrades who died during Cadet flight training. Located north of Lusk Reservoir and near the Flight Memorial, the names of the cadets who died during cadet flight training are inscribed upon the monument.	
American Soldier's Statue		1980	Erected in 1980 as a memorial to the American Soldier, especially in the modern era with likenesses of World War II period soldiers. Located at the sharp bend in Stony Lonesome Road at the north end of Lusk Reservoir.	
Battle Monument		1897	Dedicated in 1897 by Civil War veterans who paid for the monument through their pay and by donation. The names of 2,230 officers and soldiers of the Regular Army are inscribed on the monument. The column was designed by Stanford White, while the statue atop the column was sculpted by Frederick MacMonnies.	
Buckner Memorial		1946	Located on the shore of Lake Popolopen at the Camp Buckner, this monument memorializes Lieutenant General Simon Bolivar Buckner, Jr., who died while observing battle at Okinawa during World War II, making him the highest ranking American general officer to die by enemy fire during the war.	
Cadet Monument		1818	Dedicated in 1818 in memory of Cadet Vincent M. Lowe, who had died in 1817 in a premature cannon discharge. The monument is located at the far northeast corner of the West Point Cemetery, in the oldest part of the cemetery grounds. The names of cadets who died in the line of duty during the academy's earliest days are inscribed on the monument.	
Corbin Monument		1926	Dedicated in 1926 in memory of Margaret Corbin, who had died in 1800. The monument is located near the entrance of the West Point Cemetery, between the Old Cadet Chapel and Washington Road. Corbin was a heroine of the American Revolution who lived and died in Highland Falls, NY after the war.	
Custer Monument		1879	Dedicated in 1879 in honor of George Armstrong Custer, this monument once stood near the site of present-day Taylor Hall. The pedestal once had a statue of Custer atop of it, but after objections to the statue design by Custer's wife, the statue was replaced by an obelisk. The pedestal was moved to his gravesite upon construction of Taylor Hall.	
Dade Monument		1845	Originally located on the site of current-day Cullum hall on the bluff overlooking the Hudson. It was moved across Cullum road to in front of Cullum hall in 1898, then later moved to its current location in the West Point Cemetery. Monument memorializes Francis L. Dade and his 110 troopers who were killed at the Dade Massacre in 1835.	
Eisenhower Monument		1983	One of the newer monuments at the academy. Sculpted by West Point graduate Robert L. Dean, Jr., and located on the southwest corner of the Plain, the sculpture memorializes former General of the Army and 34th President of the United States Dwight D. Eisenhower.	
Flight Memorial		1992	Dedicated in 1992 in memory of all cadets and graduates who have died in flight-related accidents. Located behind the Air Cadet Monument at the north end of Lusk Reservoir, the statue was sculpted by Walker Hancock.	
Grant Monument		2019	The newest monument at West Point, dedicated in 2019 to honor former President of the United States and Commander of the Union Army during the American Civil War Ulysses S. Grant. Located on the Plain adjacent to Thayer Road across from Battle Monument.	
Kelleher-Jobes Memorial Arch		1939	Located at the north entrance of Flirtation Walk, this archway memorializes cadets William P. Kelleher and Charles S. Jobes, who died during their third class year.	
Kosciuszko's Monument		1828	Memorial to General Thaddeus Kosciuszko, a Polish officer and engineer who assisted the Continental Army during the Revolutionary War. Located on the site of the former Fort Clinton, where he designed the defenses during the Revolutionary War. The column and pedestal were dedicated in 1828, while the statue was added in 1913.	
L'Ecole Polytechnique Monument		1919	Donated by the students of the French Military Academy to the Corps of Cadets in 1919. The monument currently stands in the cadet Central Area away from general public access. The statue is a replica of a monument to French cadets who took part in the defense of France in 1814. First-year cadets are required to know the four "mistakes on the French Monument": curved saber but straight scabbard; flag blowing one direction, coat tails the other; button unbuttoned; and cannonballs too large for bore of the cannon.	
MacArthur Monument		1969	Located at north end of MacArthur Barracks near the Superintendent's quarters. Memorializes former General of the Army, Superintendent, and Medal of Honor awardee Douglas MacArthur. Dedicated by his widow in 1969, the statue was sculpted by Walker Hancock.	
Patton Monument		1950	Originally located across the street and facing the old library, the monument was placed into storage in 2004 to make way for the construction of the new library, Jefferson Hall. This monument to General George S. Patton was re-dedicated in 2009 in a temporary location near the Eisenhower Monument. When the renovations to the old library and Bartlett Hall are completed, Patton's monument will be moved to its permanent location near the right field foul pool of Doubleday Field, facing northwest towards The Plain.	
Parker-McAniff Memorial		1963	Located at the north entrance of Flirtation Walk, this monument memorializes cadets Bob Parker and Fred McAniff, who both died as cadets while members of the class of 1963.	
Sedgwick Monument		1868	Located off Washington Road just south of Battle Monument, this monument memorializes Union Army Major General John Sedgwick. The statue was donated by the officers and men of his command. He was the highest-ranking Union officer to die in the Civil War.	
Sheridan Memorial		1931	Located on Flirtation Walk, this memorial is dedicated to Richard B. Sheridan Jr, who died on the gridiron of the Yale Bowl in October 1931.	
Southeast Asia Memorial		1980	Located at the southwest edge of Lusk Reservoir, this monument memorializes all members of the armed forces of the United States who fell in Southeast Asia. Sometimes called the first Vietnam Memorial, it was named more generally to recognize those who died in Vietnam, Cambodia, Laos, Thailand, other countries and offshore. It was funded by the classes of 1960 through 1969.	
Thayer Monument		1883	Located across from the Commandant's quarters on Washington Road, this statue memorializes the "Father of the Military Academy", the third Superintendent, Sylvanus Thayer. The monument has been located at several locations as the academy grounds have expanded. Each year during Graduation Week, the oldest living graduate of the academy lays a wreath at this memorial during a special reunion ceremony.	
Washington Monument		1916	Originally near the Superintendent's Quarters on the north end of the Plain, moved to its current location near the entrance of Washington hall. This monument memorializes General George Washington, commander of the Continental Army and the first President of the United States.	
Wirt Robinson Memorial		1940	Located on the hillside northwest of Arvin Gymnasium just beyond Stony Lonesome Road, this memorializes Colonel Wirt Robinson, a well liked former professor.	
Wood's Monument		1814	Now located in the cemetery, this is the oldest monument at the academy. Dedicated in honor of Colonel Eleazer Wood, an engineering officer and 1806 graduate of West Point who was killed in the War of 1812. Old prints of West Point show this monument located on a knoll near the flag pole. As the academy expanded, it was relocated to its current location in the cemetery.	
