= Sedgwick Monument (West Point) =

Memorial to Union General John Sedgwick at West Point

Coordinates: 41.3933°N 73.958493°W

- United States
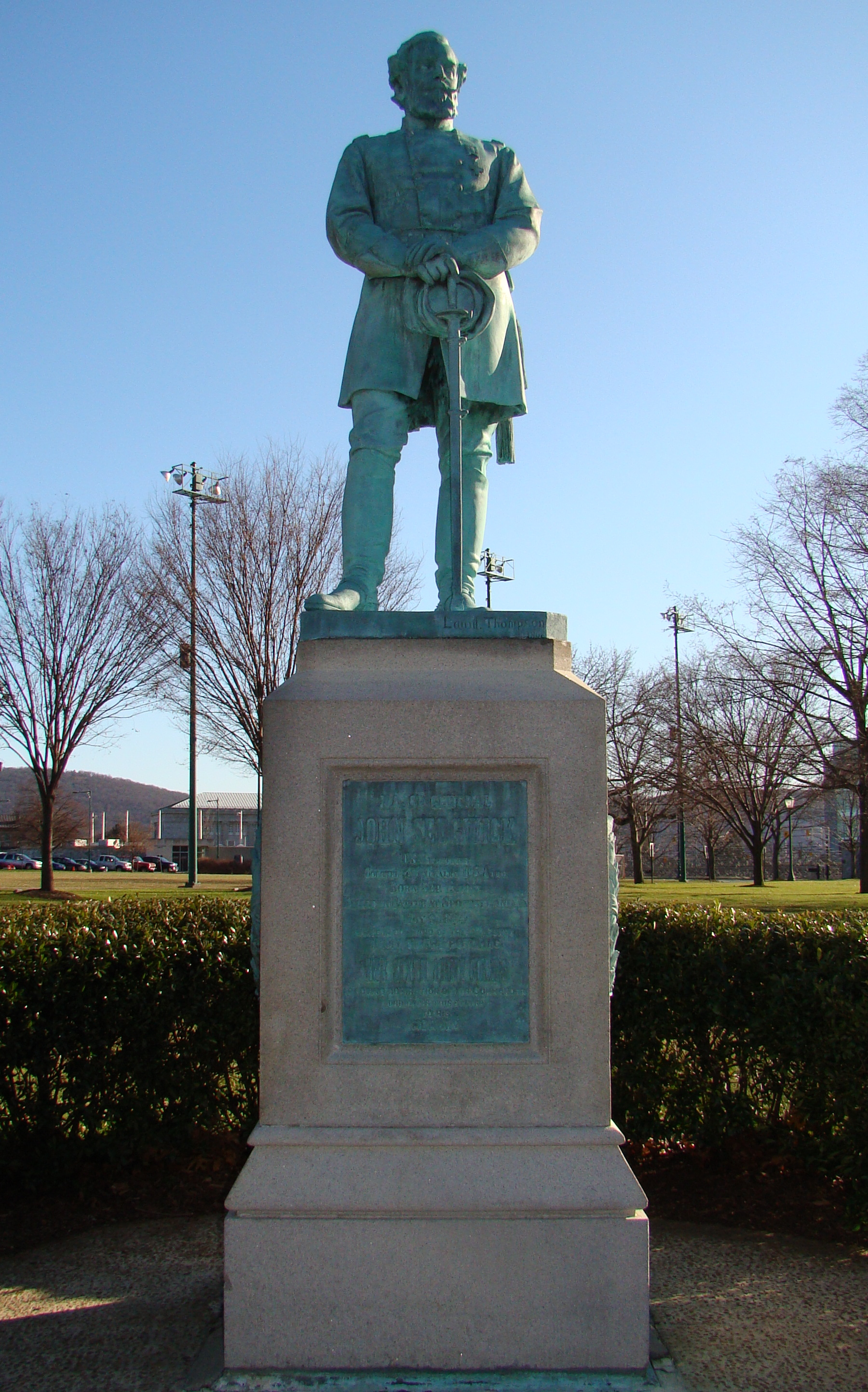
- Sedgwick monument at West Point
- For John Sedgwick
- Unveiled: 21 Oct 1868
- Location: near Highland Falls, New York
- Designed by: Launt Thompson

Sedgwick Monument is a memorial to Union General John Sedgwick at West Point. "Uncle John" Sedgwick was born in Cornwall, Connecticut, 67 miles (108 km) northeast of West Point, New York. Sculpted by Launt Thompson and dedicated in 1868, the monument was erected by officers and soldiers of the 6th Army Corps to commemorate Major General Sedgwick and his death at the Battle of Spotsylvania Court House in 1864. Originally, the monument was located on the northwest edge of the Plain, it was later relocated to its current location at Trophy Point across Washington Road from Battle Monument. Legend holds that if a cadet is deficient in academics, the cadet should go to the monument at midnight the night before the term–end examination, in full dress, under arms, and spin the rowels on the monument's spurs. With the resulting good luck, the cadet will pass the test.
