= Battle Monument (disambiguation) =

Battle Monument may refer to:

- Battle Monument, a monument in downtown Baltimore, Maryland
- Battle Monument (West Point), a monument at the United States Military Academy in West Point, New York
- Battle Monument, Trenton, New Jersey, a neighborhood in Trenton, New Jersey
