= L'Ecole Polytechnique Monument =

Monument located at the United States Military Academy in West point, New York

- United States Military Academy
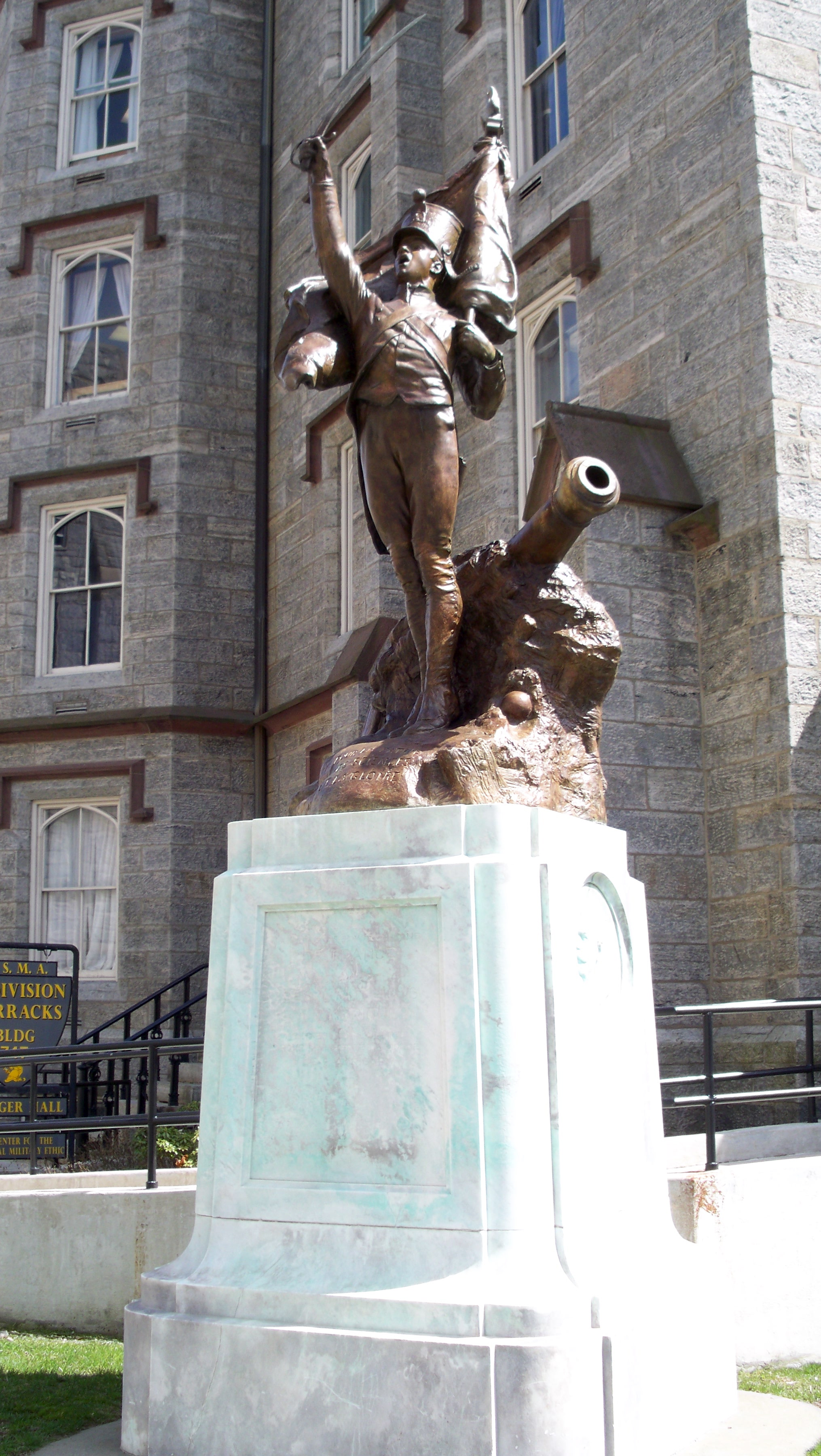
- L'Ecole Polytechnique Monument, Central Area, West Point
- Used for those deceased
- Unveiled: 1919
- Location: 41°23′28.12″N 73°57′25.89″W near Highland Falls, NY
- Commemorated: French Cadets who died in defense of France and brotherhood in arms with the cadets of West Point

Burials by nation
- United States of America

L'Ecole Polytechnique Monument is a statue and monument located at the United States Military Academy in West point, New York. It is a replica of a statue at École Polytechnique that commemorates the cadets of that French school who died in defense of France in 1814. In 1919, in the wake of Franco-American cooperation in the First World War, an association of alumni of the École Polytechnique presented a full-size casting of the statue to West Point as a symbol of brotherhood between the two nations and schools.

First year cadets (plebes) are required to know the four "mistakes on the French Monument": the curved saber but straight scabbard; the flag blowing one direction, the coat tails the other; button unbuttoned, and the cannonballs too large for bore of the cannon. The monument was once located on the edge of the Plain, but has now been moved inside the cadet Central Area and is off limits to non-academy personnel.
