= Trophy Point =

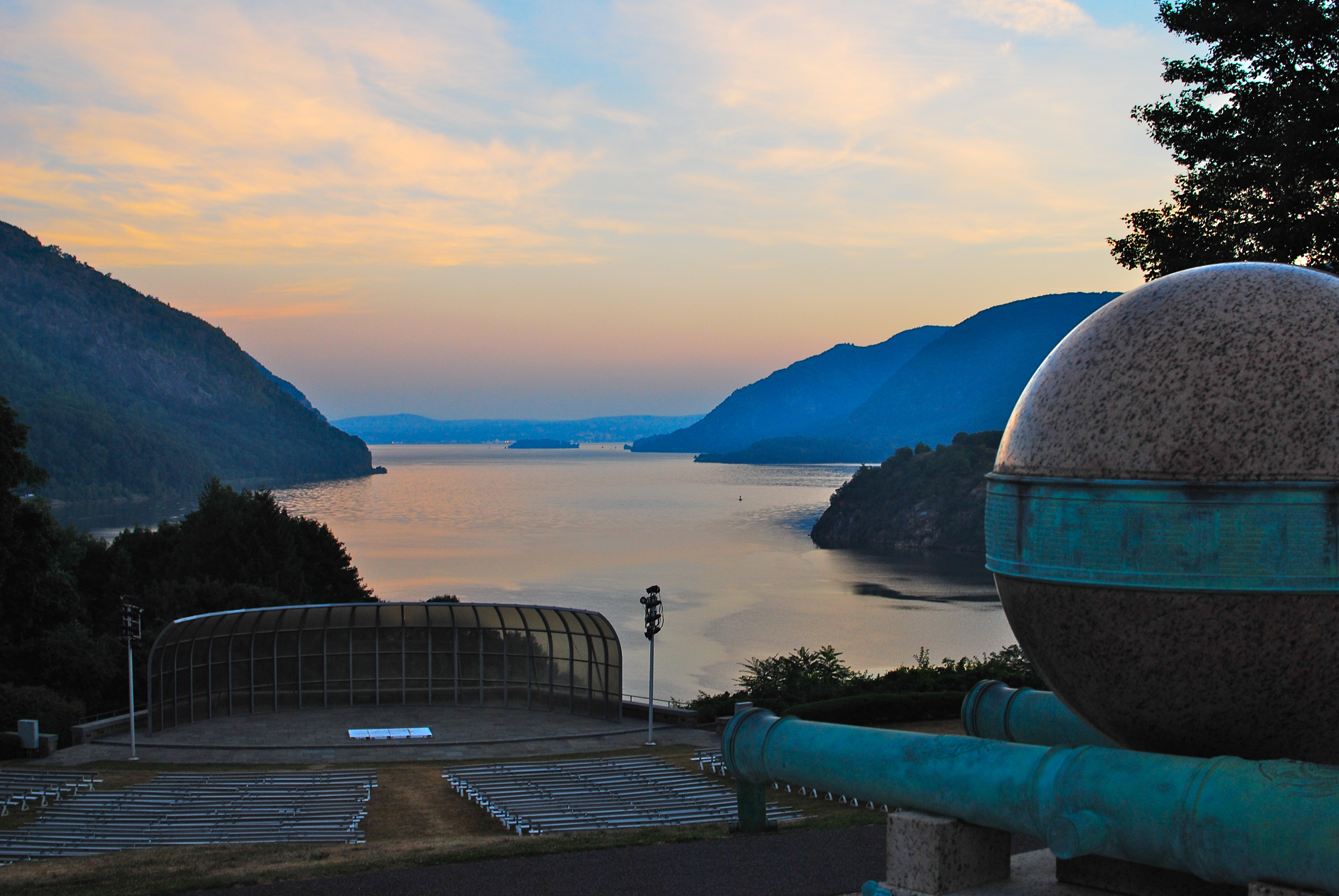
- Hudson River viewed from Battle Monument
- Interactive map of Trophy Point
- Location: United States Military Academy, West Point, NY
- Nearest city: Highland Falls, NY
- Coordinates: 41°23′41″N 73°57′25″W
- Manager: US Army

Trophy Point is a scenic overlook of the Hudson River Valley located at West Point, New York. It has been the subject of numerous works of art since the early 19th century. Trophy Point is the location of Battle Monument, one of the largest columns of granite in the world. Designed by architect Stanford White and dedicated in 1897, Trophy Point was formerly the site of West Point graduation ceremonies before the class sizes became larger in the mid-twentieth century.

Trophy Point gets its name from the numerous displayed pieces of captured artillery spanning from the Revolutionary War to the Spanish–American War. From the 1840s to the 1930s it was the site of the Siege Battery where cadets learned artillery.

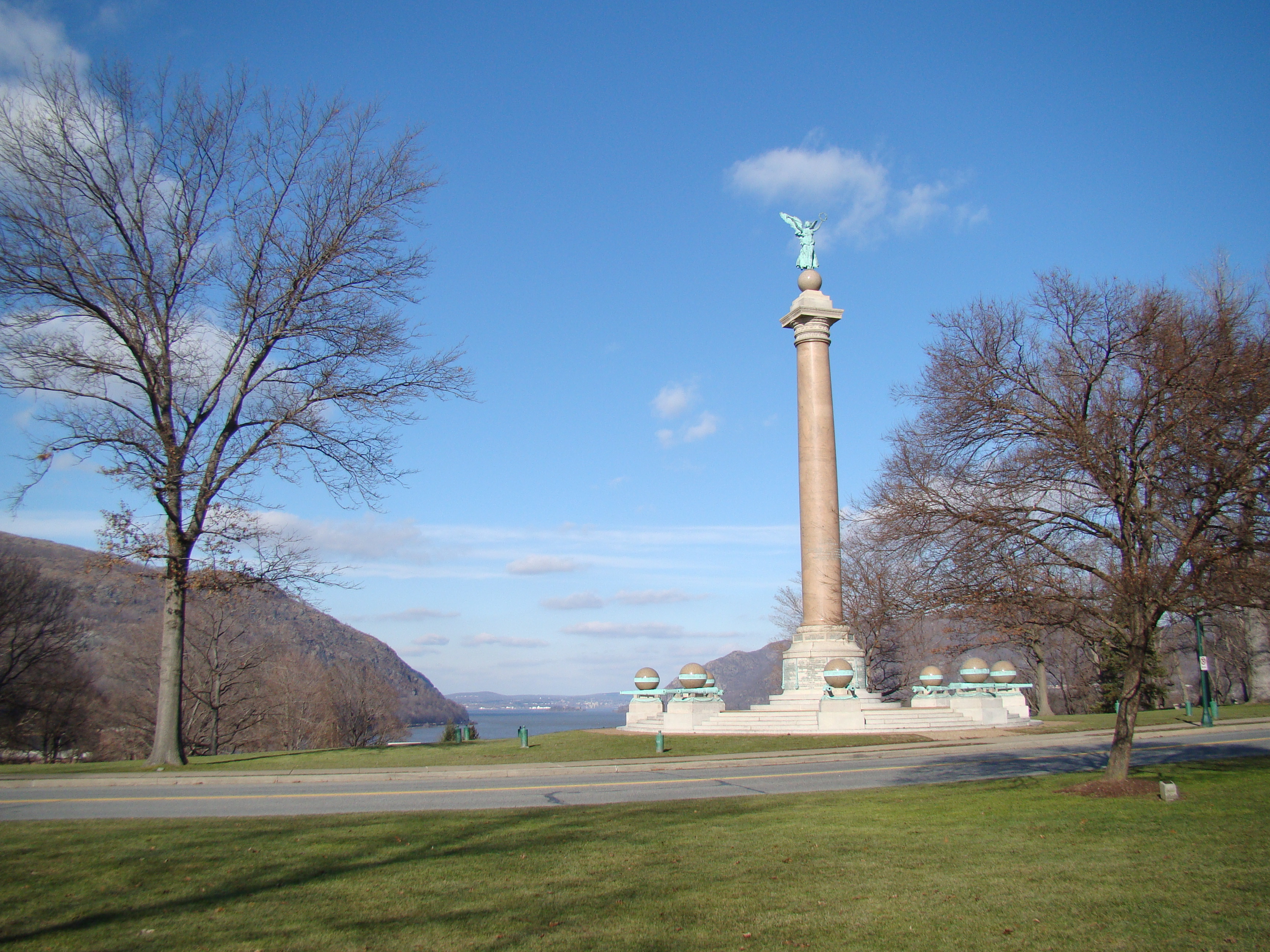
Battle Monument

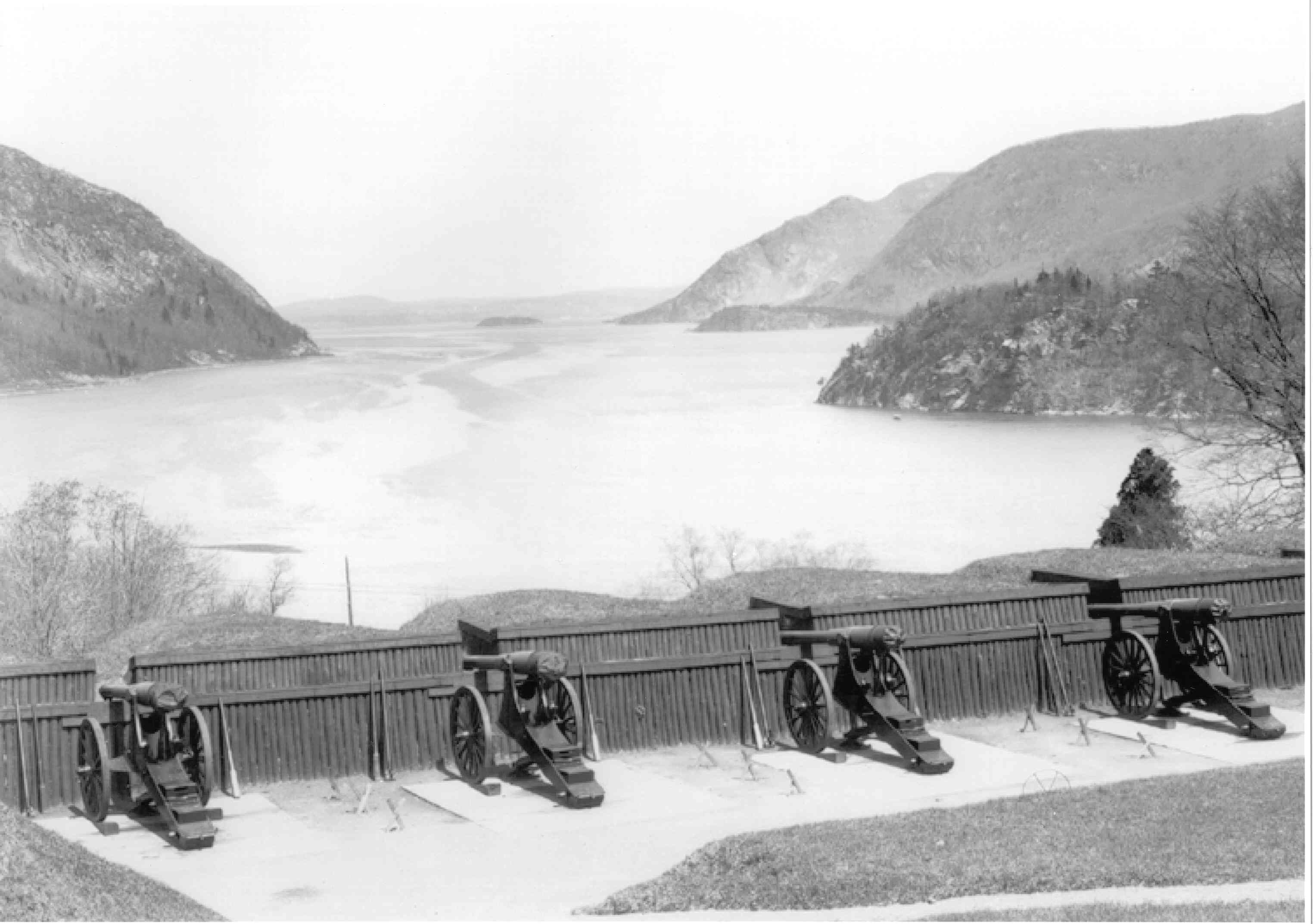
c. 1860

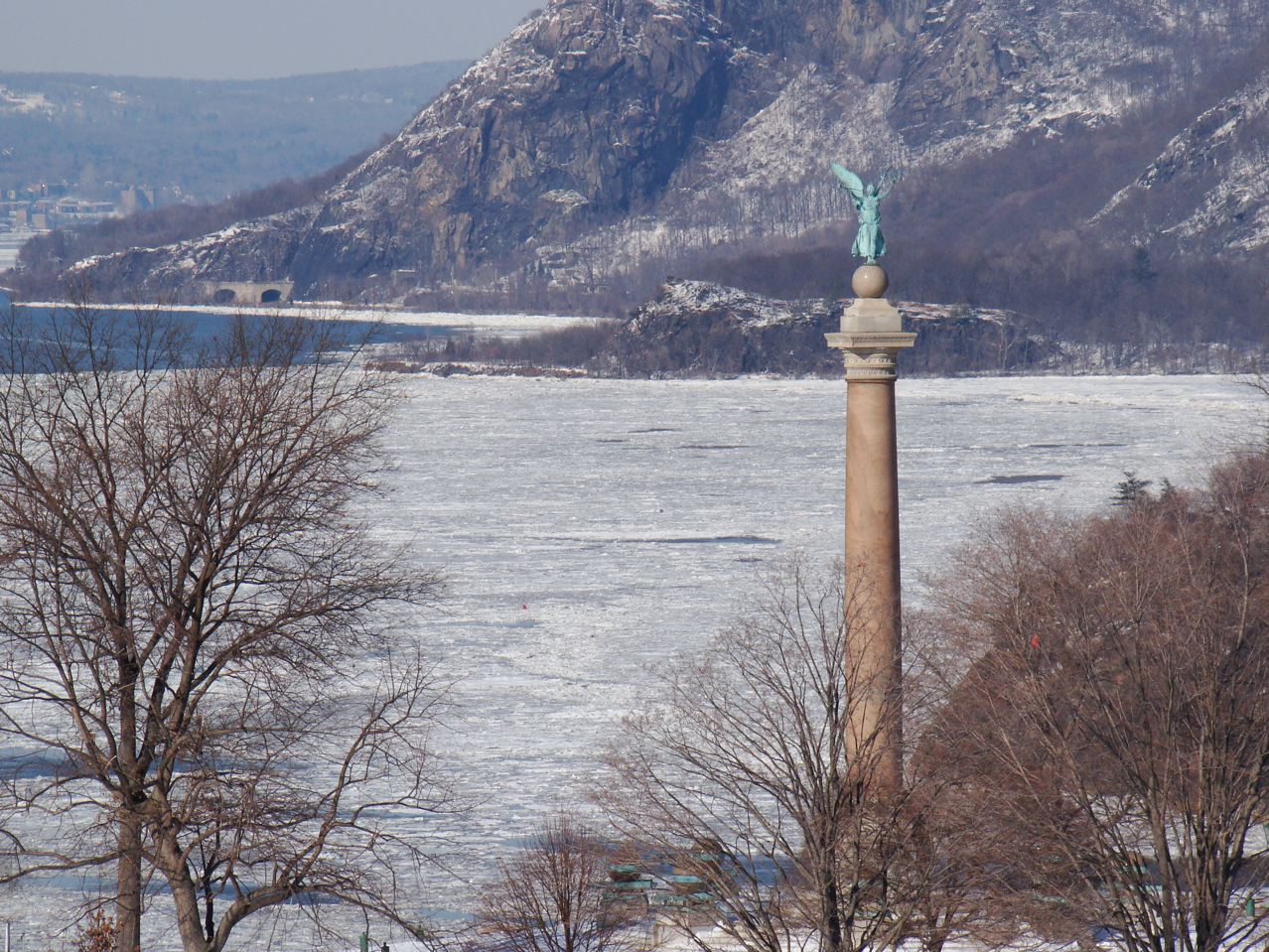
Trophy Point and Battle Monument seen from Jefferson Hall

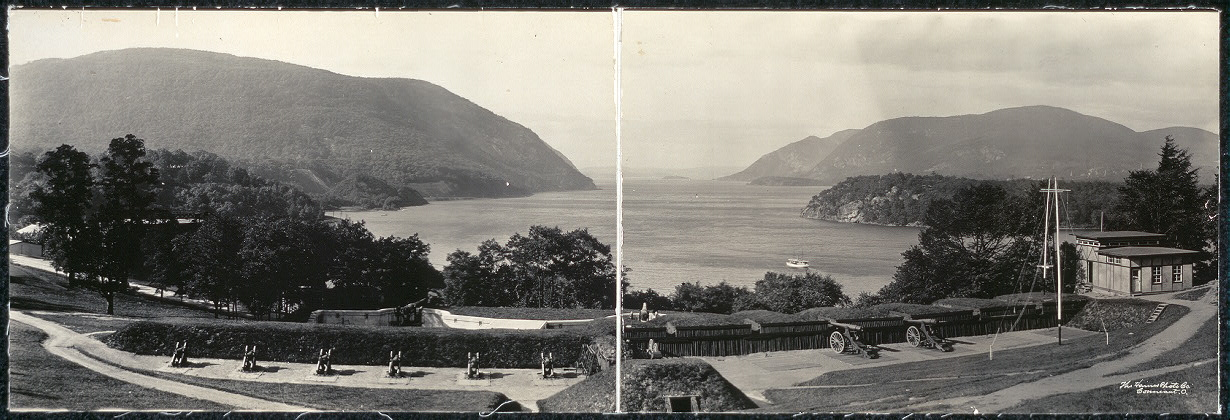
Looking north, 1909

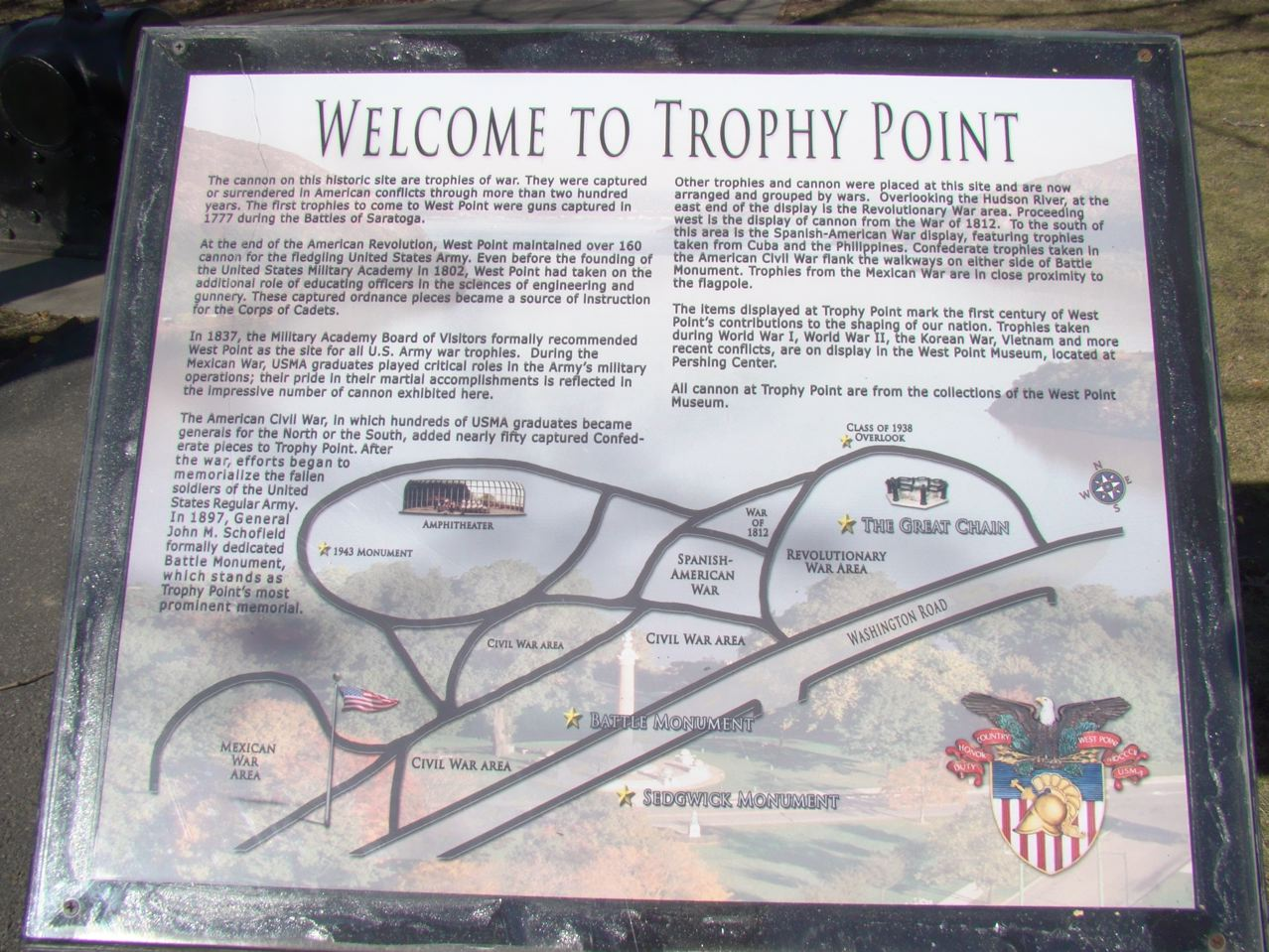
Trophy point visitor map

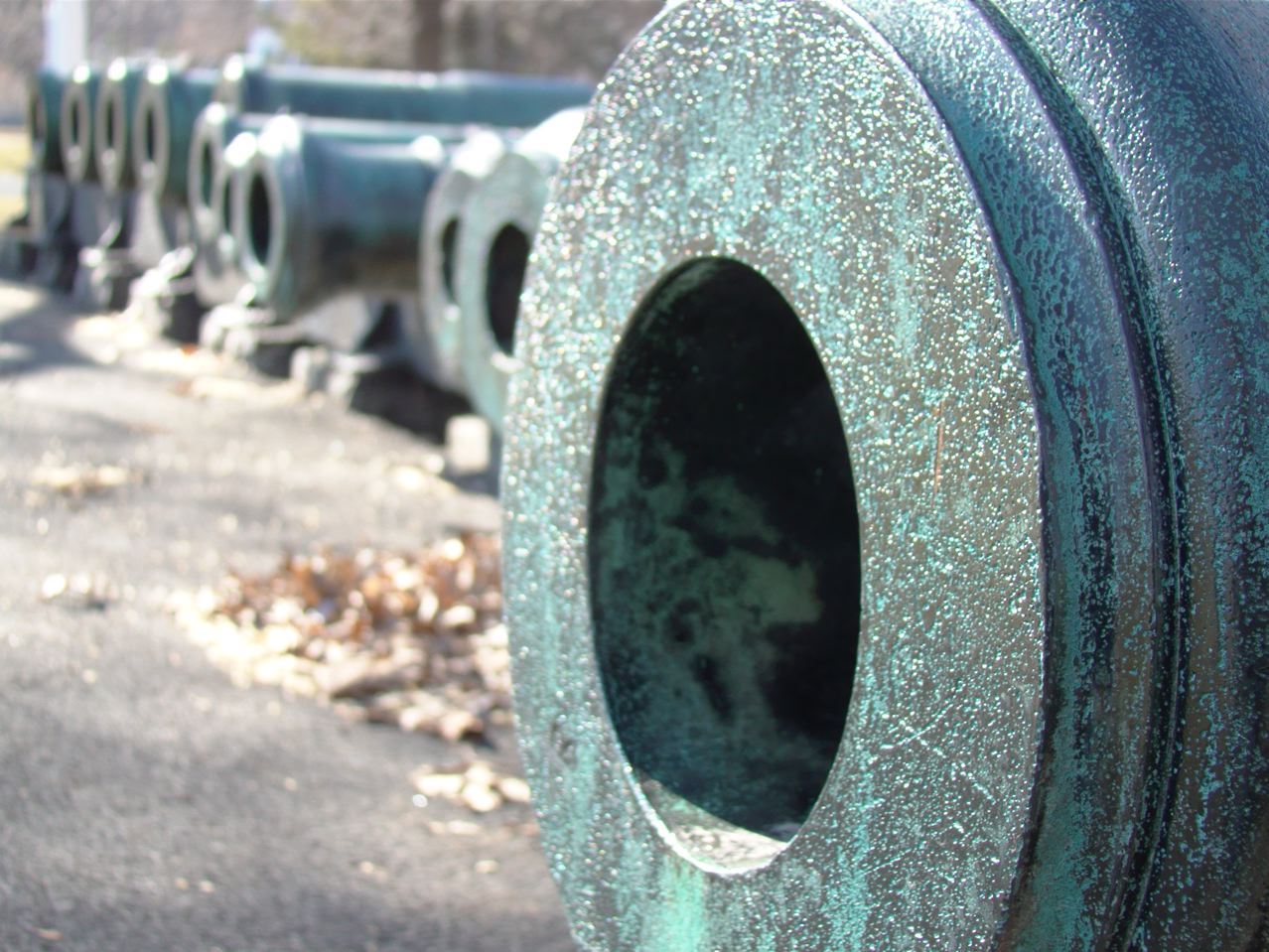
Cannon on display

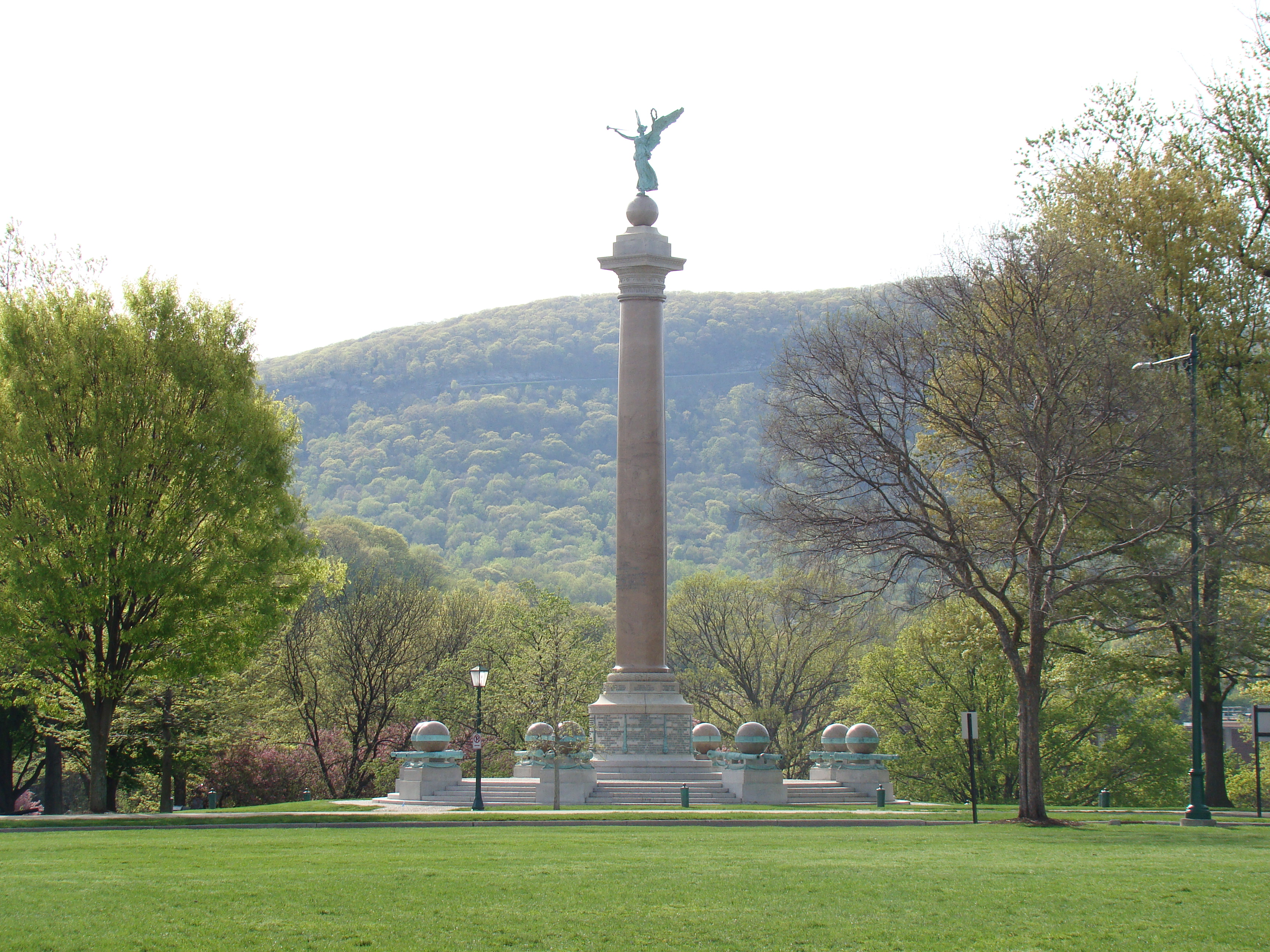
Battle Monument on a spring afternoon

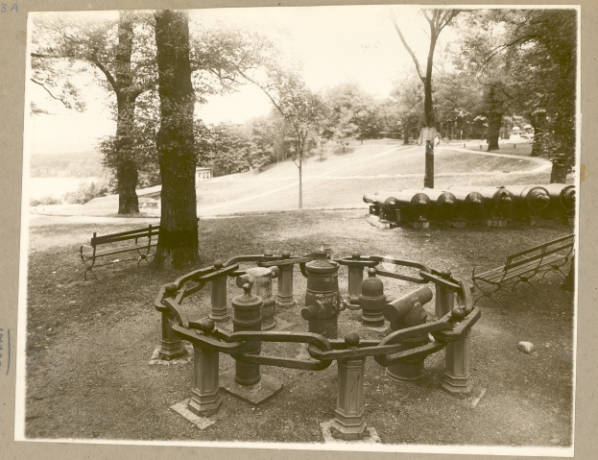
The Great Chain on display at Trophy Point in 1933

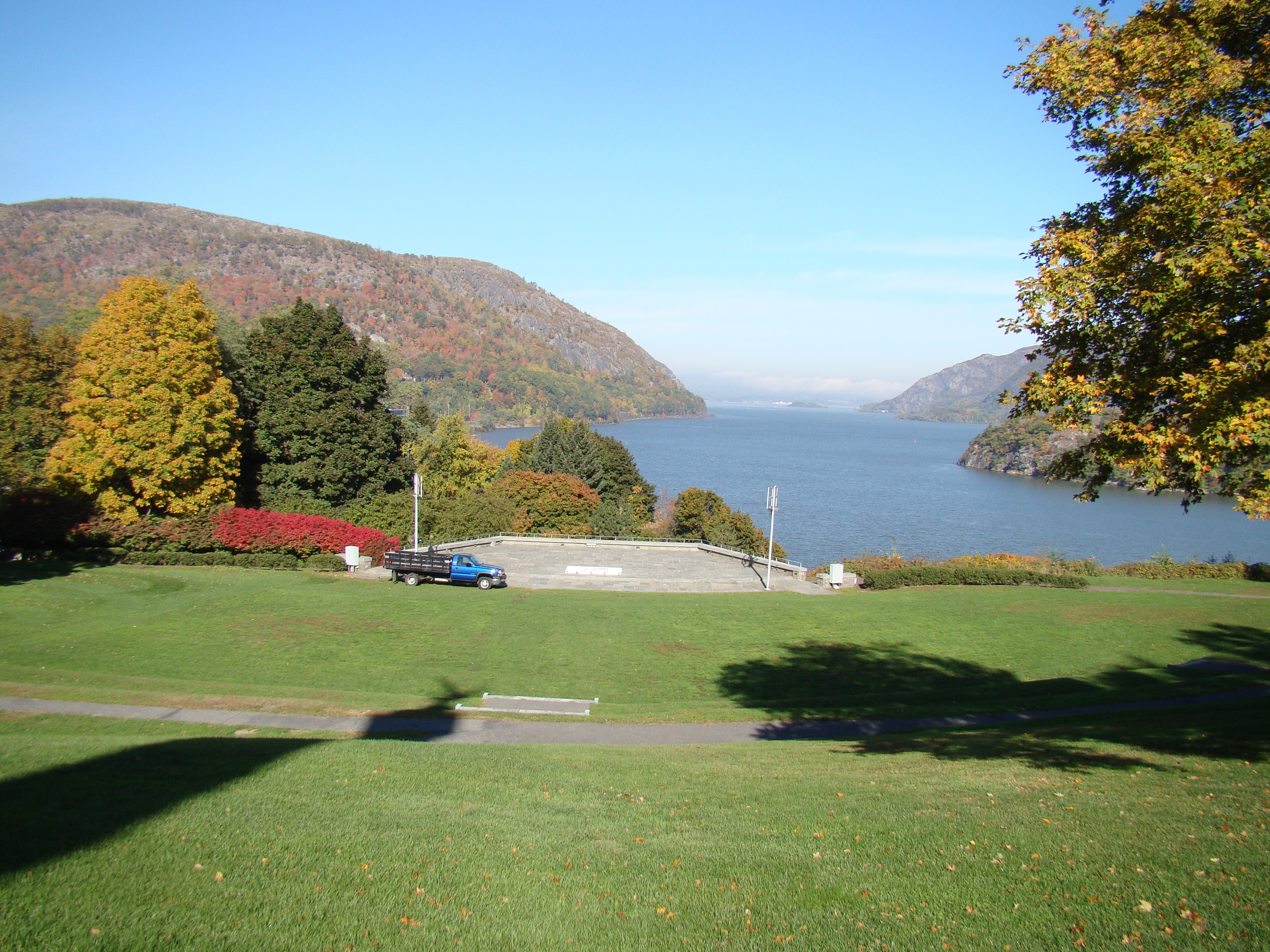
View from Battle Monument in the Summer
