= The Plain (West Point) =

Parade field at the US Military Academy

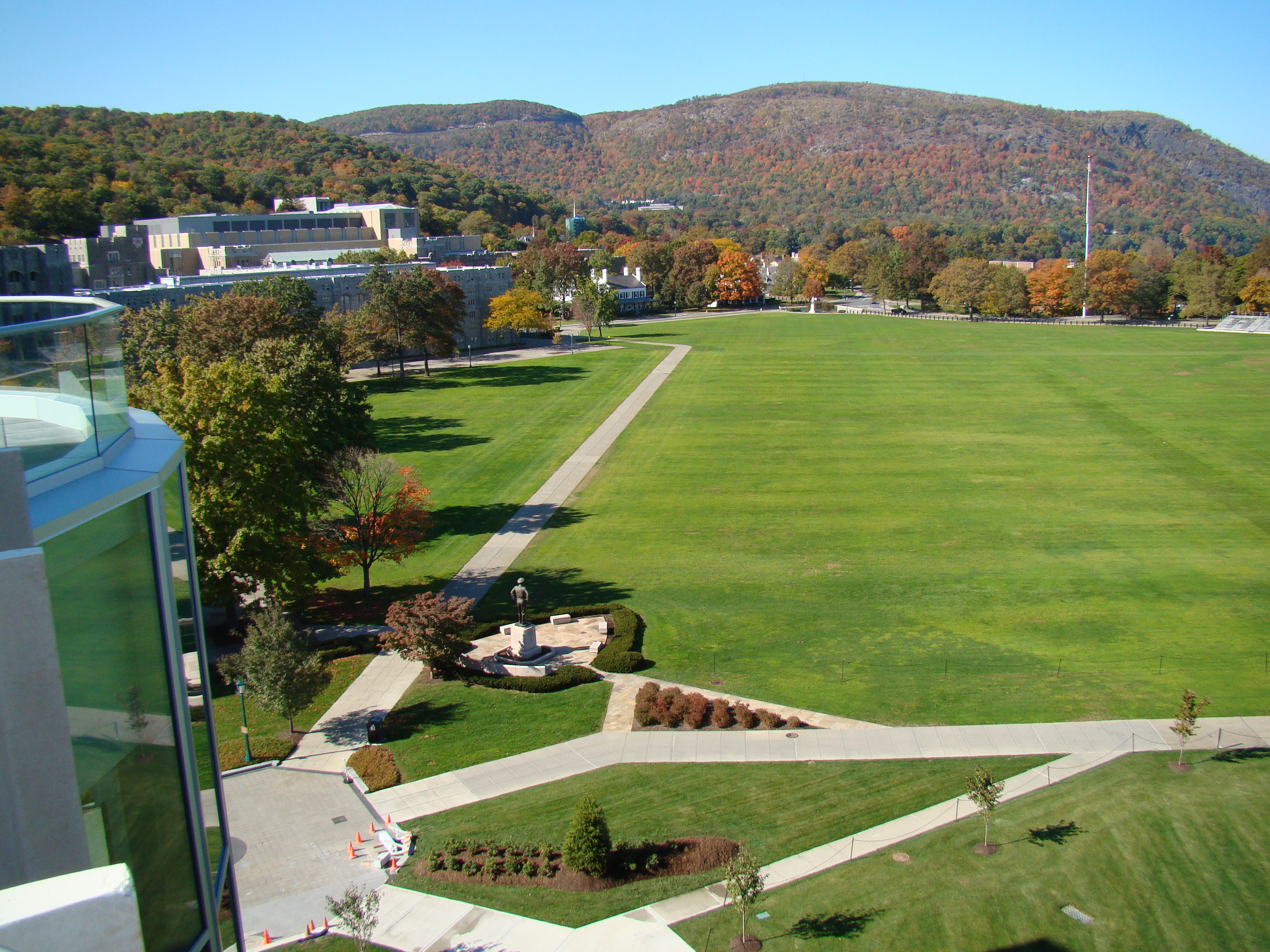
- The Plain at West Point as viewed from the balcony of Jefferson Library, with Eisenhower statue and Diagonal Walk in foreground.

- Location within New York Location within the United States
- Location: West Point, New York
- Nearest city: Highland Falls, New York
- Coordinates: 41°23′35″N 73°57′25″W
- Established: 1778; 248 years ago
- Manager: US Army

The Plain is the parade field at the United States Military Academy at West Point, New York. The flat terrain of the Plain is in contrast to the varied and hilly terrain of the remainder of the campus. The Plain rises approximately 150 feet (45 m) above the Hudson River and has been the site of the longest continually occupied U.S. Army garrison in America since 1778. In its early years, the entire academy was located on the Plain and it was used for varying activities ranging from drill and mounted cavalry maneuvers to an encampment site for summer training to a sports venue. Currently, the Plain refers to just the parade field where cadets perform ceremonial parades.

== Geography ==
The Plain in the early days of the academy comprised approximately 40 acres (16 ha) of relatively flat ground rising approximately 150 feet (46 m) above the Hudson River. It was not always the level and manicured parade ground that is seen today.

== History ==
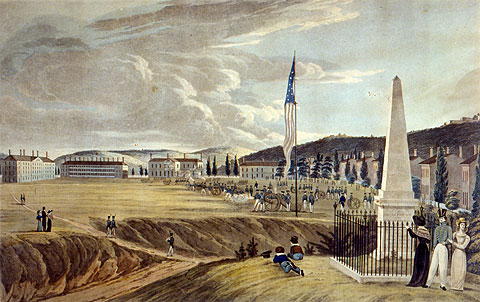
The Plain in 1828. All structures in the painting are now gone and Wood's Monument is moved to the cemetery.

Before the development of the modern academy, the term "The Plain" referred to the relatively flat geographic area that the current academy occupies. It included the area where Fort Clinton was constructed. The term now specifically applies to the parade field. The Connecticut militia that first occupied West Point on 27 January 1778 encamped there during that particularly harsh winter. That summer, construction began on Fort Arnold, later to be renamed Fort Clinton, which stood at the far eastern edge of the Plain and overlooked the sharp westerly turn in the Hudson River. The land was owned by a private citizen, a Mr. Stephen Moore of North Carolina. Secretary of the Treasury Alexander Hamilton authorized the army's purchase of the land for $11,085 in 1790.

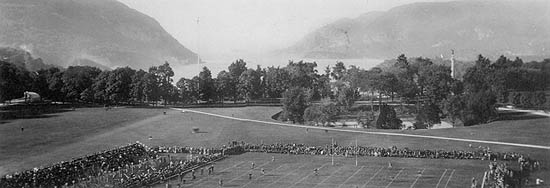
Football on the Plain, c1900. Execution Hollow is clearly visible just above the diagonal walkway in the mid-right of this picture. Battle Monument is on the back right side of it.

In the early days of the academy, the Plain was used for many purposes beyond its current use for ceremonial parades. From its earliest days until just after World War I, the Corps of Cadets spent their summers encamped on the Plain as part of their tactical field training. Semi-permanent tents were erected, hard-floor planking, and furniture and books were moved out to the campsite as the Cadets moved out of the barracks for the summer. Cadets practiced military drill and cavalry maneuvers on the Plain's open areas. However, after the superintendency of Douglas MacArthur from 1919 to 1922, summer camp was no longer held on the Plain. Before the construction of Michie Stadium, the Army football team played their home games upon the Plain. For the first 100 years of the academy, there was a large depression on the northern edge of the plain near trophy point. This area was known locally as Execution Hollow as reportedly military executions occurred there during the Revolutionary War period. The hollow remained until 1912, when it was filled in with soil excavated from the construction of Bartlett Hall. The area now is a small grassy field between the Superintendent's review stands, Clinton Field, and Battle Monument on Trophy point. The field contains a small putting green used by the Department of Physical Education for golf instruction and a spruce tree planted in 2009 as a post Christmas tree.

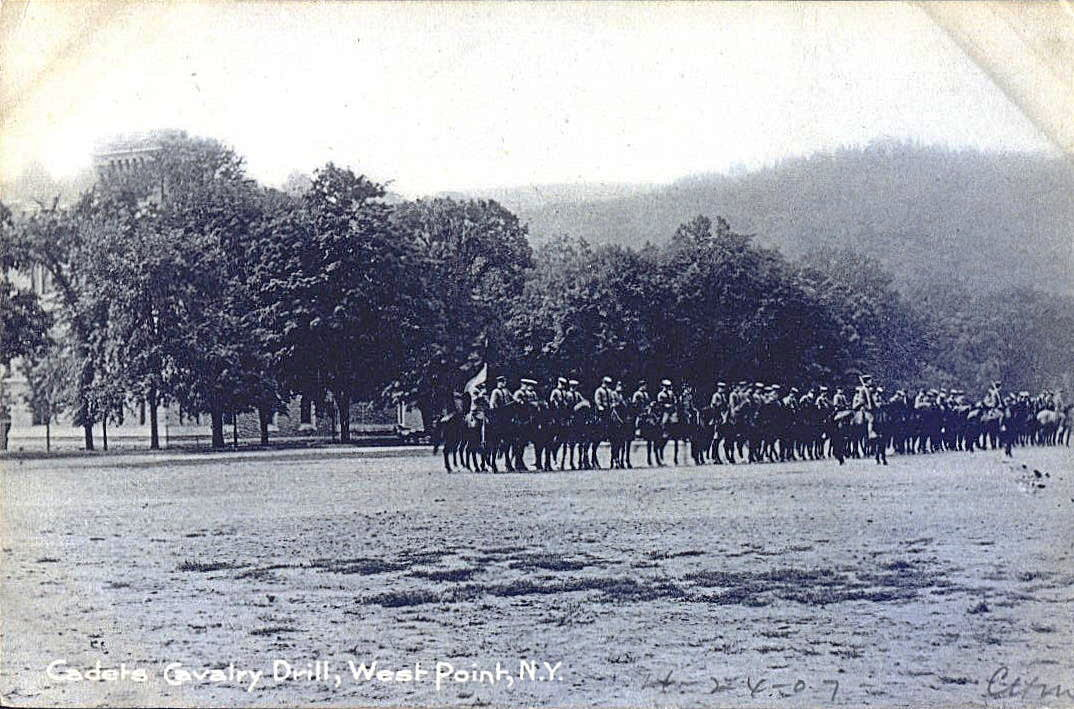
Cavalry drill on the Plain, 1907 (Pershing Barracks in the upper left)

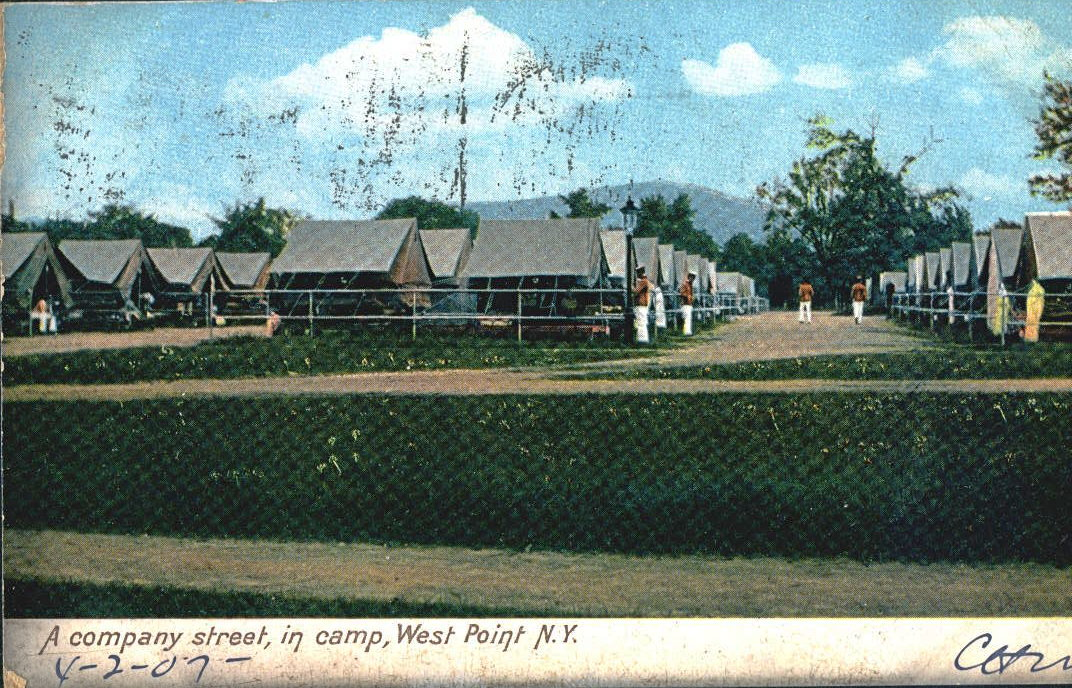
Summer camp on the Plain, 1907

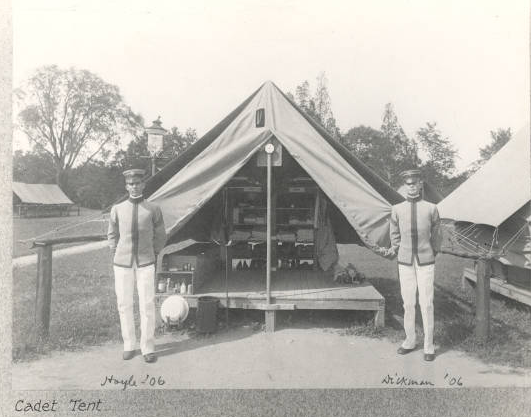
Cadet tent during summer camp, 1905

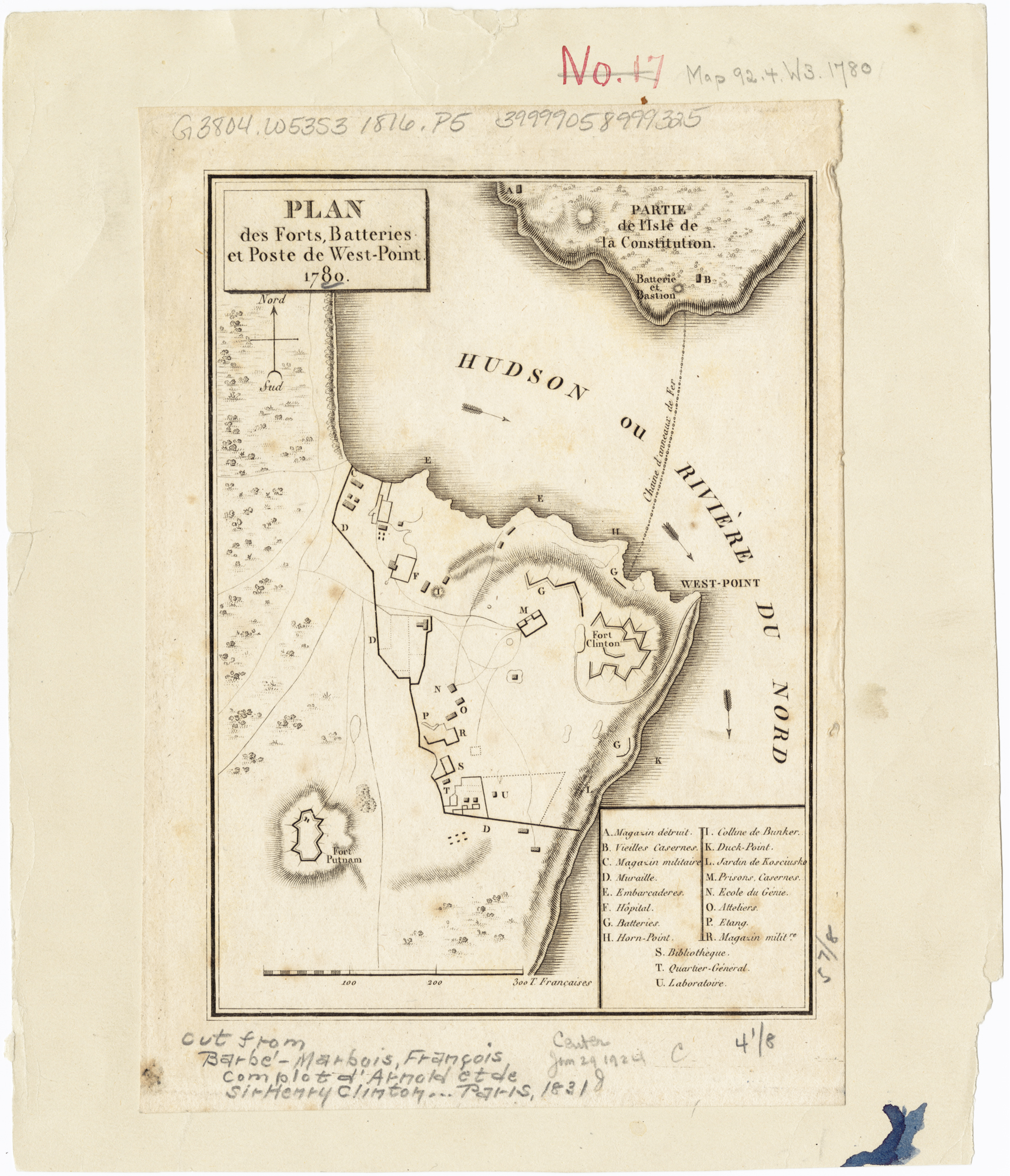
1780 map showing Ft. Clinton on the western edge of the Plain

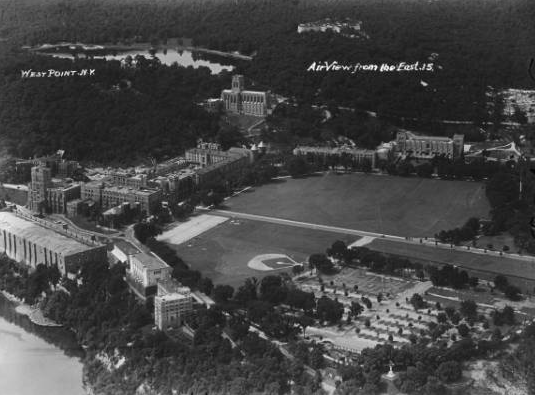
Circa 1915

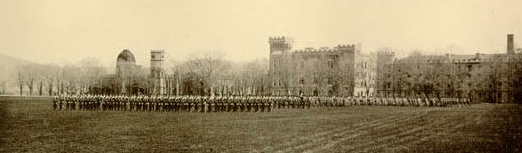
c1896, only Pershing barracks (clock tower in center) remains

== Uses ==
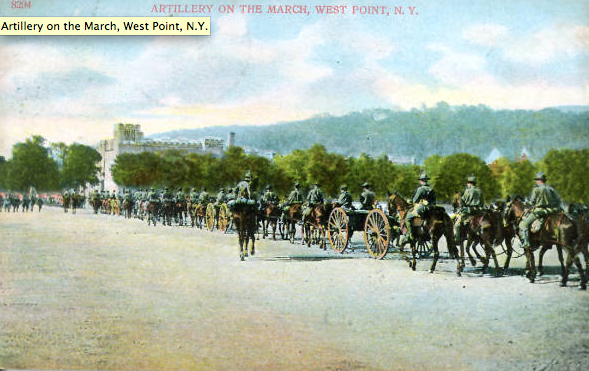
Artillery training, 1908

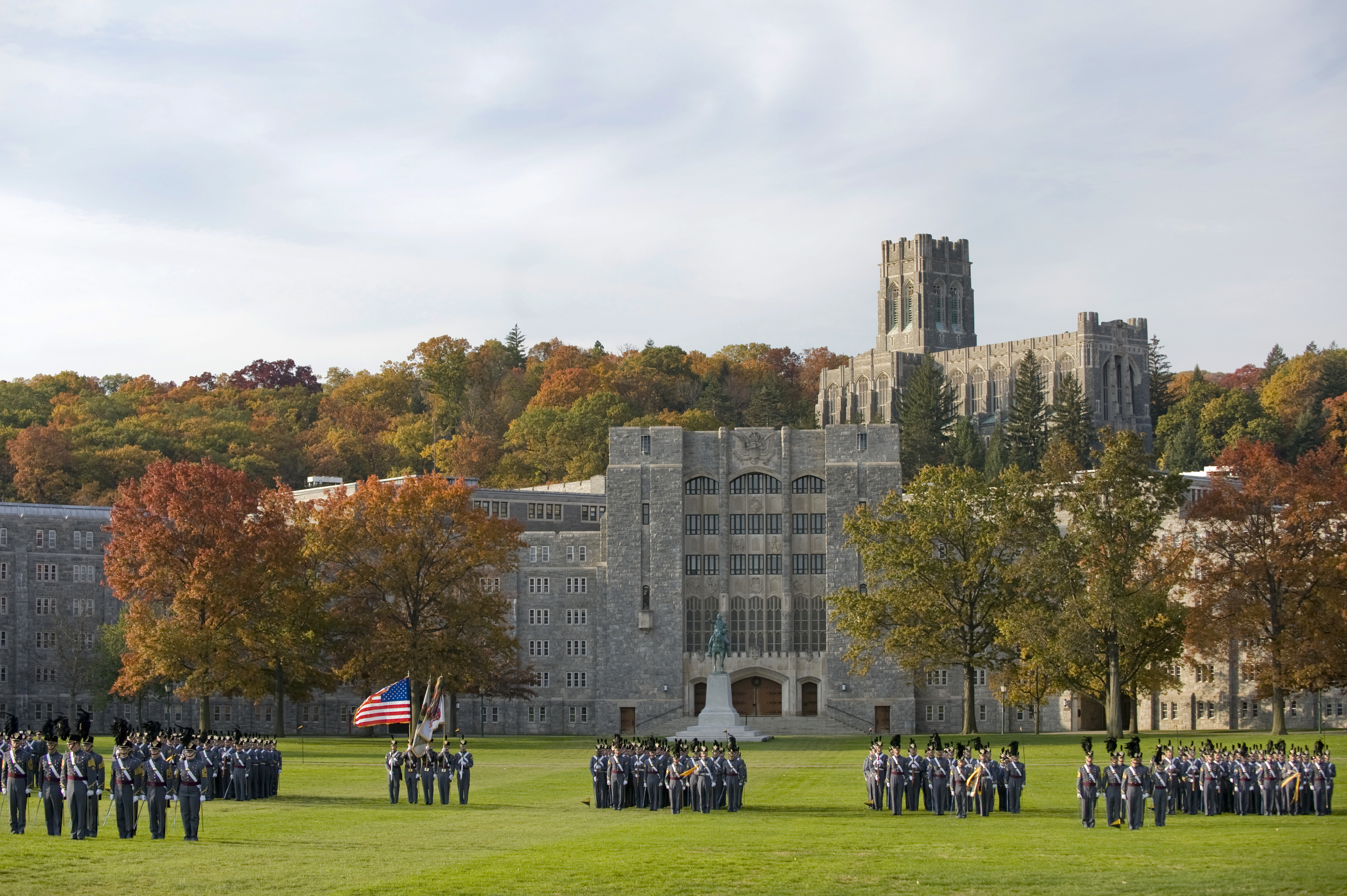
Cadet review on the Plain

The Plain in present-day is used primarily for ceremonial parades, known at the academy as "reviews". Because of the cold weather common at the academy, cadet reviews are usually held between April and November. Cadets also use the Plain for recreational activities or as a place to retreat from the barracks during the late spring or early fall. The general public is asked not to walk on the grass Plain. Visitors can access and view the Plain up-close from Diagonal Walk, a walkway which bisects the Plain running north–south from Eisenhower statue to MacArthur statue. The Plain is also the location of the Corps of Cadets' Tap Vigils when a member of the corps passes away. Shortly before 2330 hours, the entire corps assembles in silence on the large paved southern edge of the plain, known as the Apron. The traditional military hymn "Taps" is played, followed by a singing of the "Alma Mater" by the corps, followed by the playing of "Amazing Grace" by the Pipes and Drums. The cadets then disperse in silence back to their rooms.

== Monuments ==
The periphery of the Plain is home to several monuments to past American military leaders. A horse-mounted George Washington is depicted atop Washington Monument on the western edge looking out over the Plain. World War II Generals of the Army are remembered with Eisenhower Monument and MacArthur Monument, which sit at opposite ends of Diagonal Walk. In the far north west corner, Thayer Monument commemorates the "Father of the Military Academy", and stands watch over the Plain. On the far eastern edge of the Plain, just beyond Clinton field, Polish General Tadeusz Kosciuszko looks out over the Hudson River at Kosciuszko's Monument.

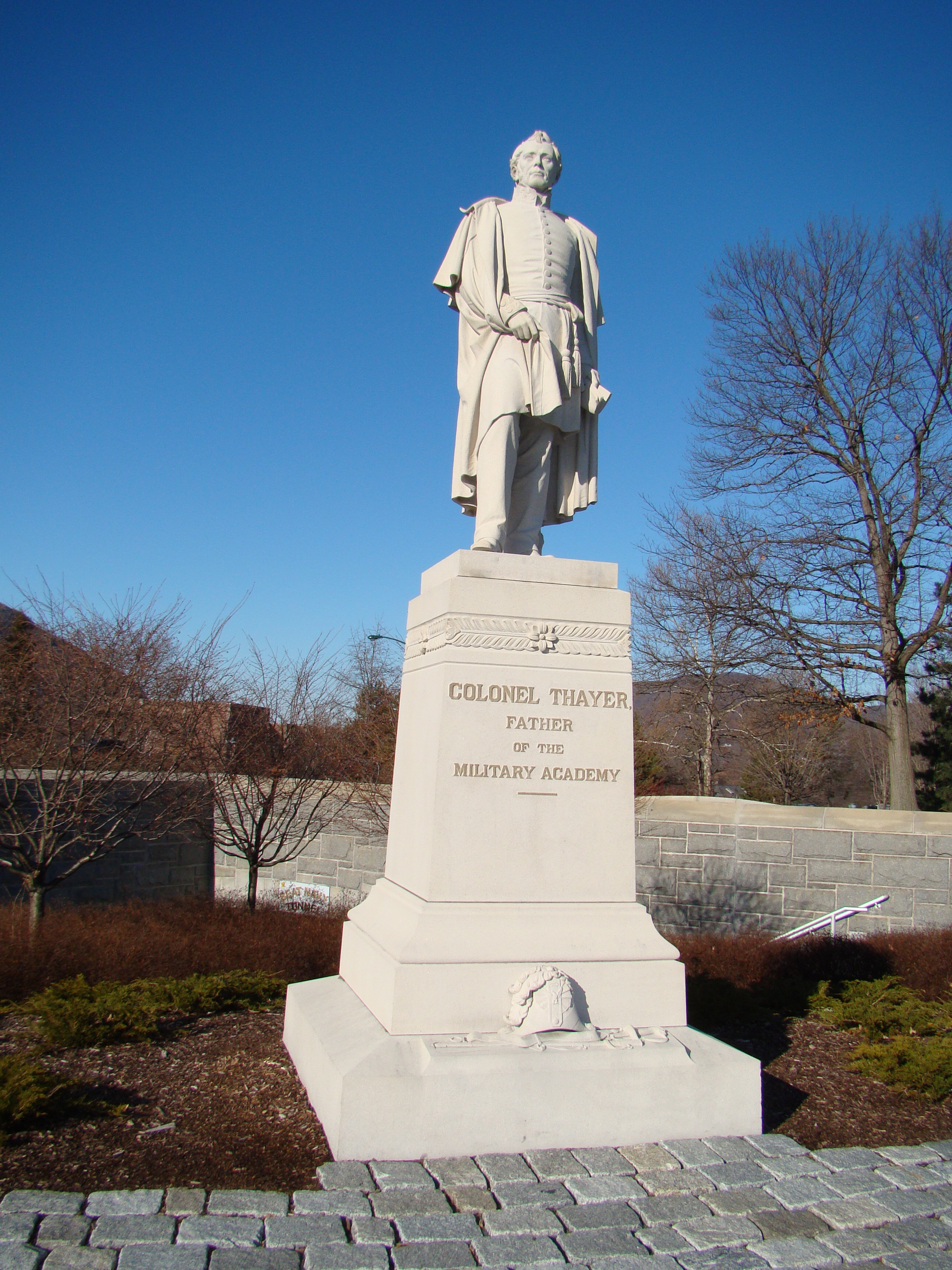
Thayer statue at northwest corner of the Plain

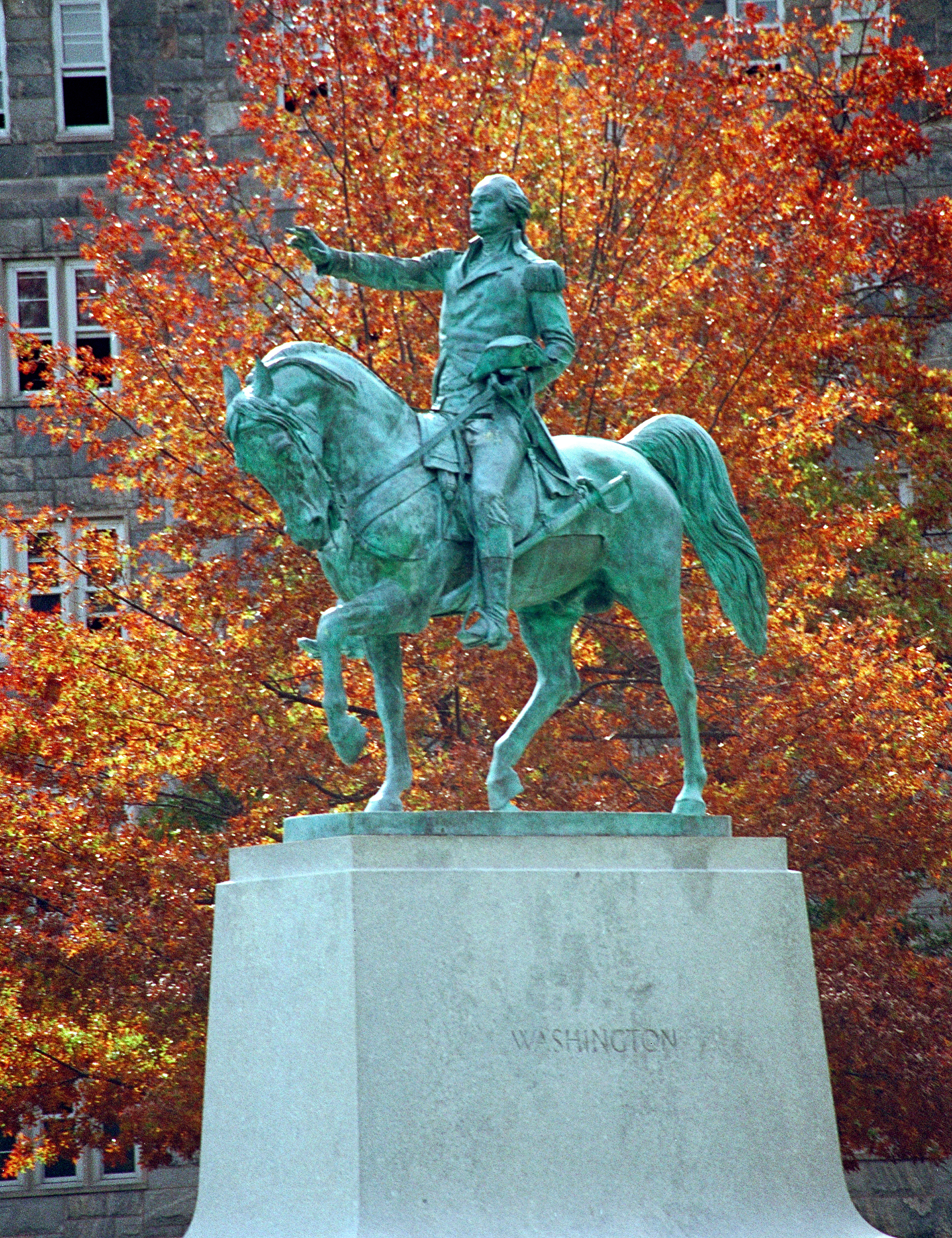
Washington Statue
