= Eisenhower Monument =

Statue at the United States Military Academy, West Point, New York

Eisenhower Monument (West Point)
- United States
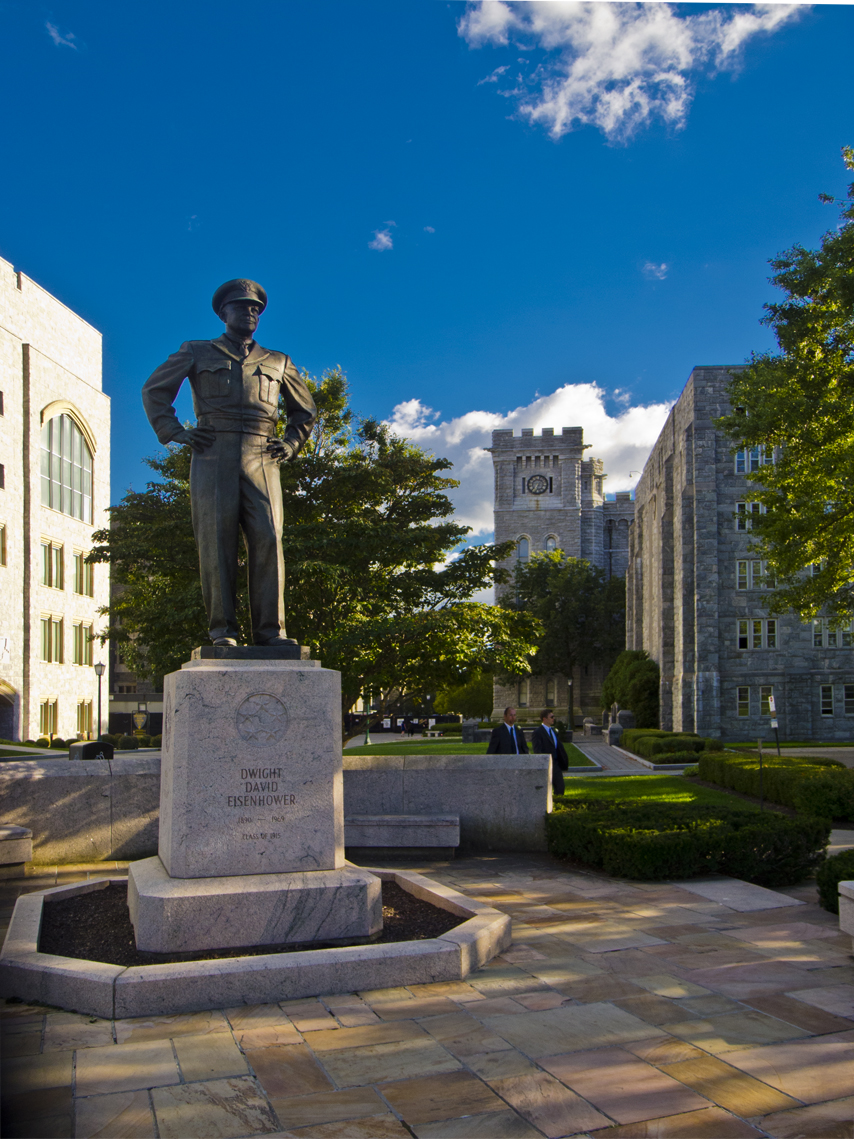
- The Eisenhower Monument at West Point
- For General of the Army and former President Dwight D. Eisenhower
- Unveiled: May 1983
- Location: 41.3915°N 73.9563°W near Highland Falls, NY
- Designed by: Robert L. Dean Jr.
- Dwight D. Eisenhower, Supreme Allied Commander Europe, 34th President of the United States

The Eisenhower Monument at the United States Military Academy is a monument to former General of the Army and the 34th president of the United States, Dwight D. Eisenhower.

== The subject ==
As a member of the famed West Point Class of 1915, (known as "The Class the Stars Fell On"), Eisenhower rose to prominence as an Army officer during World War II, where he was the Supreme Allied Commander Europe. After the war, he served as the Army's Chief of Staff before being elected President in 1952.

== Description and commissioning ==
The statue stands nine feet tall and is perched upon a pedestal of red granite.

The bid for the monument originally included noted sculptors Donald De Lue, Felix De Weldon and Walker Hancock, but the commission went to class of 1953 West Point graduate Robert L. Dean Jr. After receiving the commission, Dean was offered one of the General's actual uniforms as a model by Eisenhower's son. Dean molded the wax model at his home in Pennsylvania and cast the bronze statue in Italy before the monument was unveiled on 3 May 1983.

== See also ==
- List of sculptures of presidents of the United States
