= Kosciuszko's Monument (West Point) =

Statue at the United States Military Academy

Coordinates: 41.39462834°N 73.95263851°W

Kościuszko's Monument
- United States
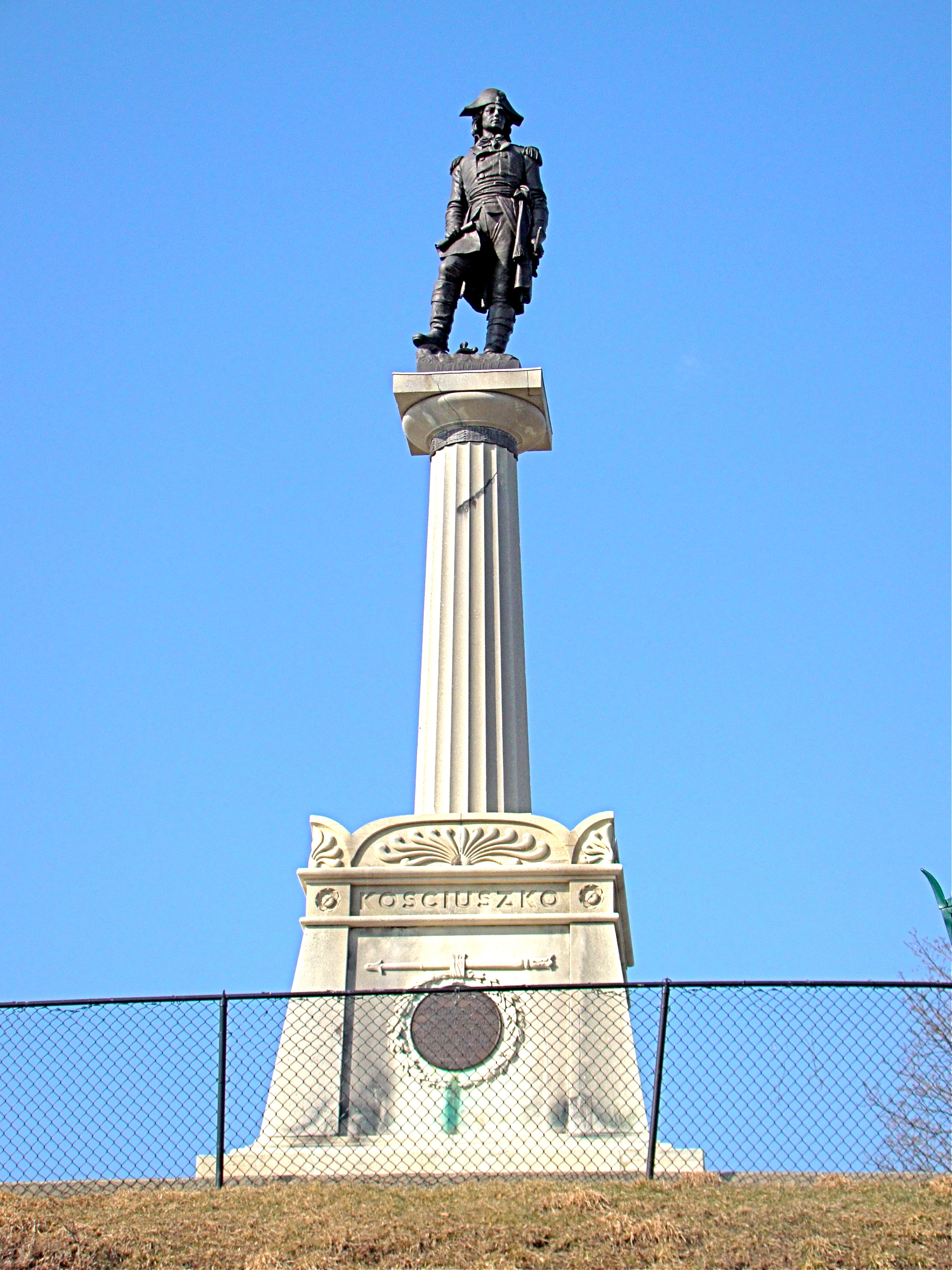
- Kosciuszko's Monument at West Point
- For General Tadeusz Kosciuszko's contribution to the defense of West Point during the American Revolutionary War
- Unveiled: July 4, 1828
- Location: near Highland Falls, NY
- Designed by: John Latrobe
- Appointed Engineer-in-Charge of West Point's Fortifications by General George Washington

Kościuszko's Monument is a pedestal and statue of Polish General Tadeusz Kościuszko at the United States Military Academy at West Point, New York. Kościuszko designed the defenses of the West Point garrison from 1778–1780 during the height of the Revolutionary War, when George Washington considered West Point to be the most important military post in America. The pedestal and shaft of the monument was first proposed in 1825 by John Latrobe, and dedicated in 1828. The statue, designed by D. Borja, was later added in 1913.

Kosciuszko, having attended the Royal Knights School in Warsaw and audited classes at the Ecole Militaire, advocated the establishment of an American military school for officers, a subject on which he wrote Jefferson many times. After Jefferson established the academy, General William Davie requested Kosciuszko write the manual, Manoeuvres of Horse Artillery, which became a textbook at the academy.

In May 2023, during a restoration of the monument's base, West Point Association of Graduates' Construction Manager Chris Branson found an unexpected time capsule placed there in 1828. The capsule was opened in August 2023 and West Point announced its archaeologist team had found six coins and a commemorative medal dating from 1795 to 1828 inside the time capsule. The items include:

- a Liberty dollar coin from 1800, measuring 1.564 inches in diameter
- a 50-cent coin from 1828, measuring 1.276 inches in diameter
- a 25-cent coin from 1818, measuring 1.066 inches in diameter
- a 10-cent coin from 1827, measuring .745 inches in diameter
- a 5-cent coin from 1795, measuring .643 inches in diameter
- a 1-cent coin from 1827, measuring 1.114 inches in diameter
- an Erie Canal commemorative medal from 1826, measuring 1.763 inches in diameter

== Gallery ==
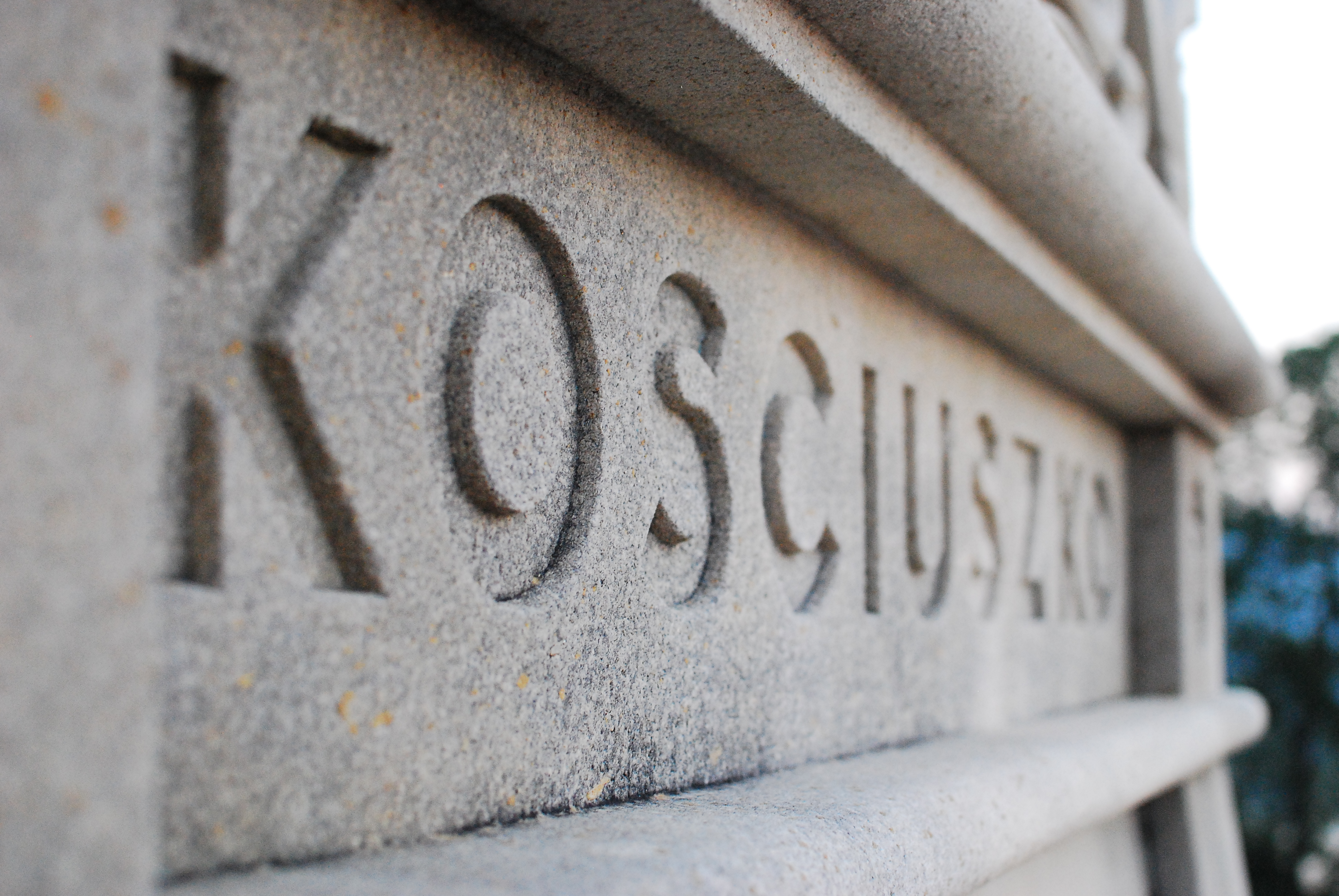
Closeup of engraving

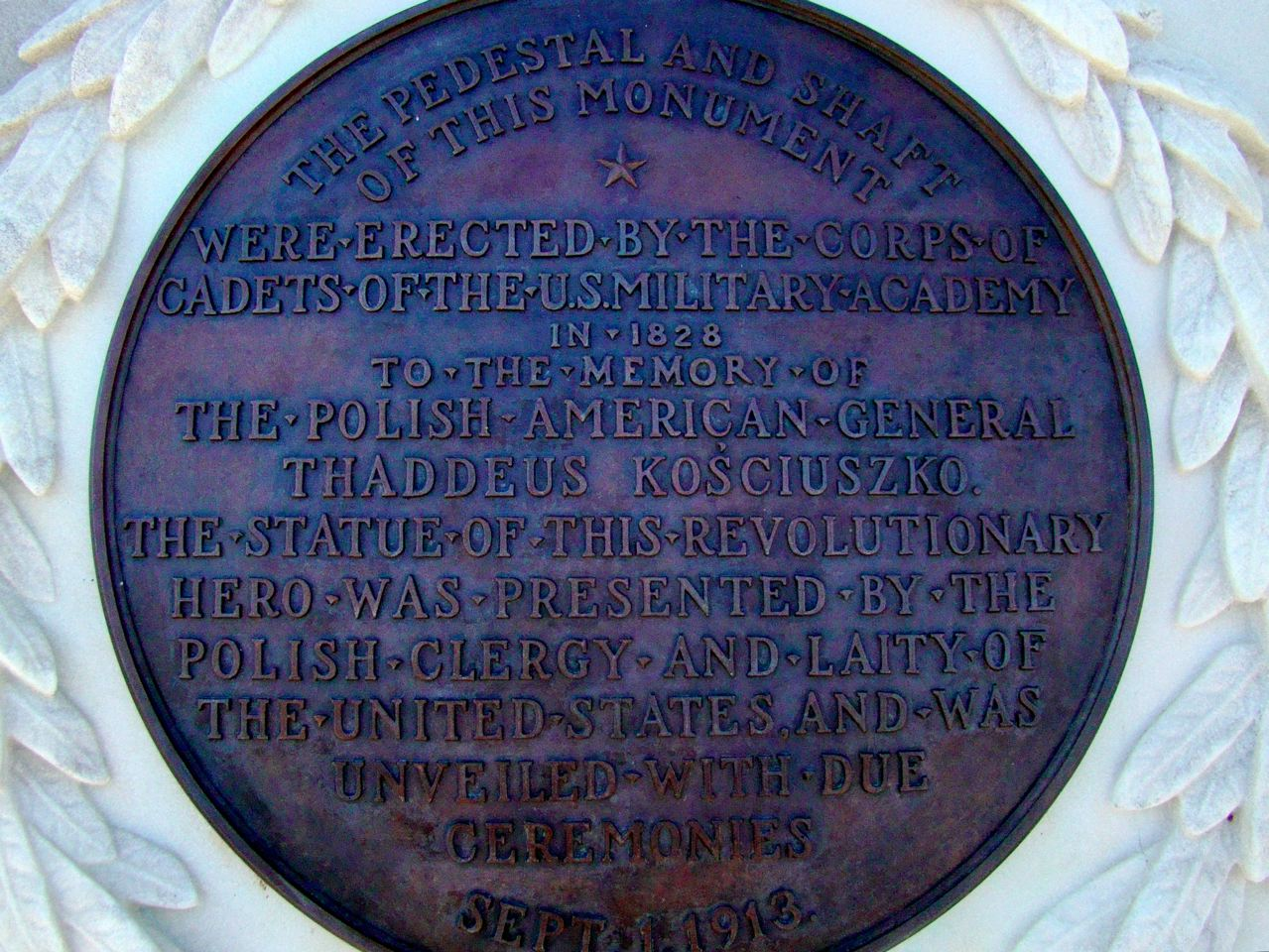
Front of monument

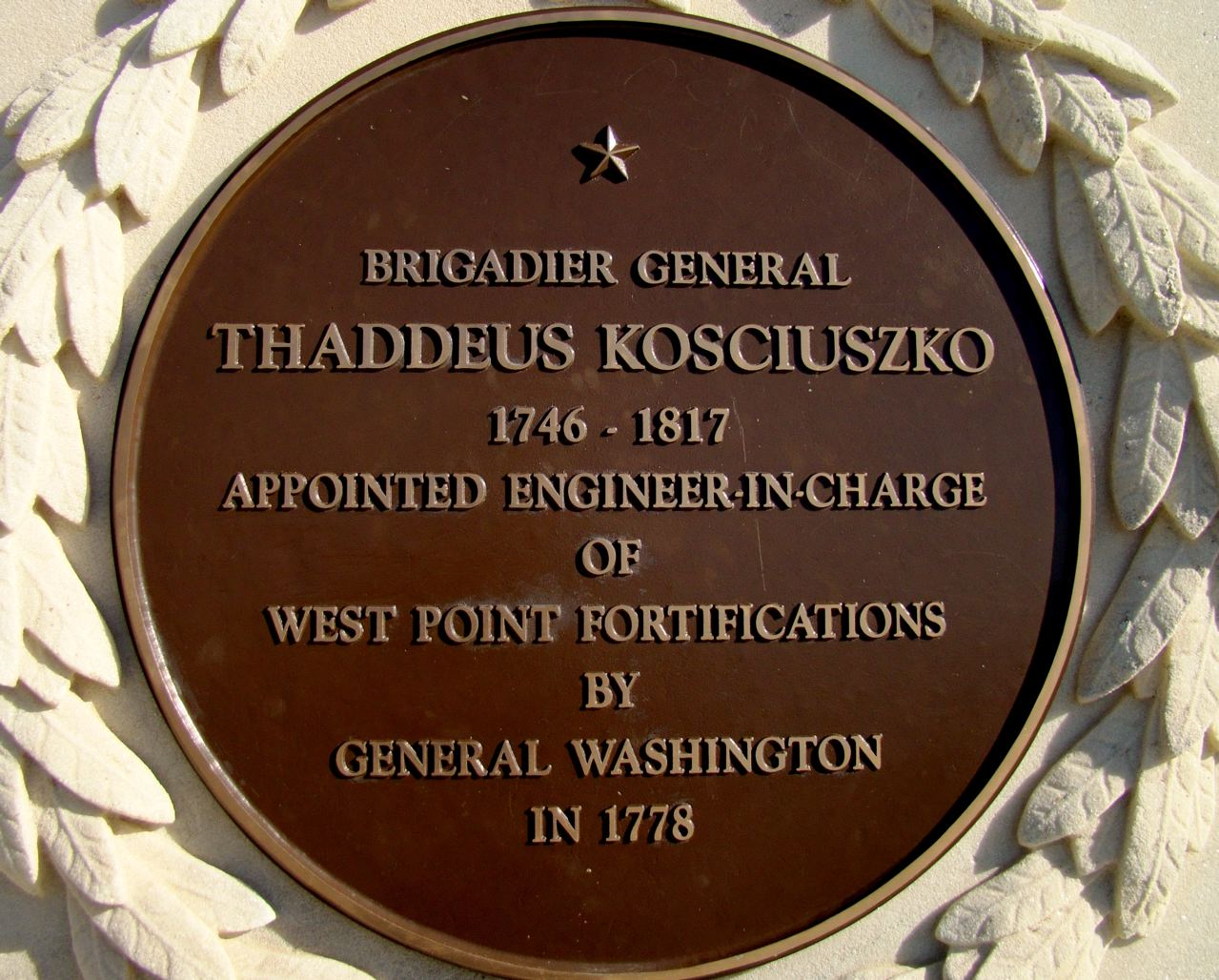
Back of monument

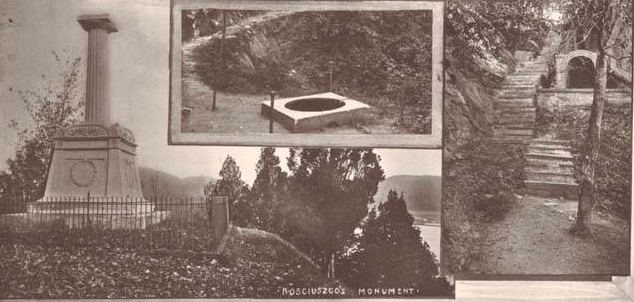
The pedestal c. 1900, before the statue was emplaced

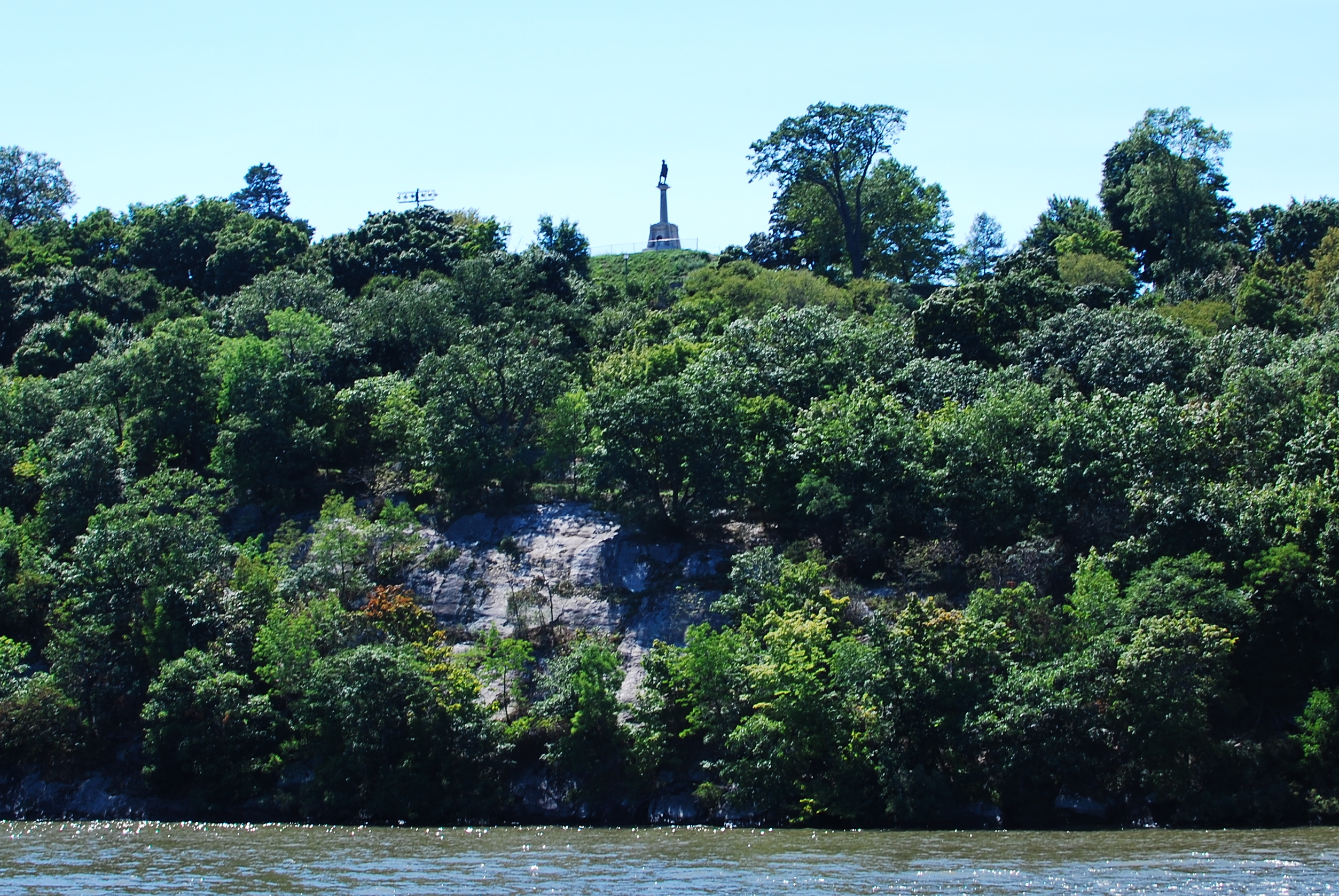
Monument seen from Hudson River
