= Battle Monument (West Point) =

- United States Military Academy
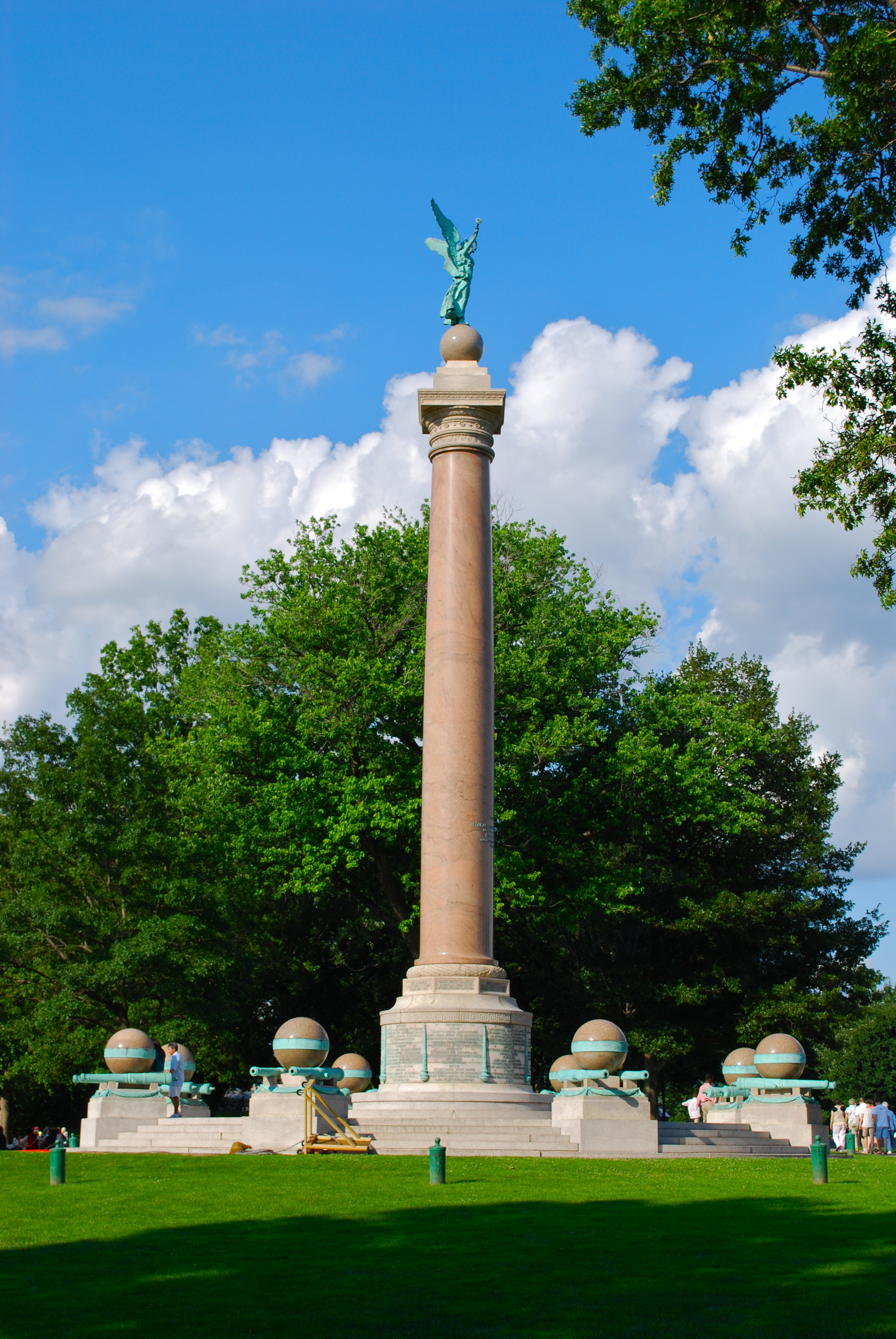
- Battle monument, June 2009
- For Officers and soldiers of the Regular Army killed in the US Civil War
- Unveiled: 30 May 1897
- Location: 41°23′40.93″N 73°57′24.66″W near Highland Falls, NY
- Designed by: Stanford White & Frederick MacMonnies
- Commemorated: 2,230 Officers & soldiers of the Regular Army

Burials by nation
- United States of America

Burials by war
- United States Civil War

Battle Monument is a large Tuscan column monument located on Trophy Point at the United States Military Academy, West Point, New York, designed by Stanford White.

== History ==
The site for the monument was dedicated on 15 June 1864 by General George McClellan where he gave a lengthy address and stated that, "The site of the Battle Monument is dedicated in commemoration of the Officers and Privates of the regular Army who have died in the present war". His speech was followed by rapturous applause after concluding it with the official dedication stating, "We now dedicate this site to the memory of brave men, loyalty, patriotism and honor."

The monument itself was dedicated on 30 May 1897 by surviving American Civil War veterans. The monument was financed by monthly contributions from the pay of the officers and soldiers of the Regular Army. The granite column, standing 46 feet (14 m) tall and 5 feet (1.5 m) in diameter, was quarried from Branford, Connecticut, and is reputed to be the largest column of polished granite in the Western Hemisphere. Inscribed on bronze straps belting the eight monumental "cannon balls" circling the column are the names of 2,230 Regular Army officers and soldiers who died for the Union during the Civil War.

A female statue designed by Frederick MacMonnies sits atop the monument, representing Fame. The statue that now tops the monument is actually the second version of the statue. Just months after it was unveiled, MacMonnies agreed to replace the original statue after complaints that it was too large and awkward.

Traditionally, the plebes at West Point made reference to the statue of Fame when giving the following reply to any upperclassman demanding to know "How are they all?": "They are all fickle but one, sir." "Who is the one?" "She who stands atop Battle Monument, for she has been on the same shaft since 1897;" however, this is no longer current practice.

== Image gallery ==
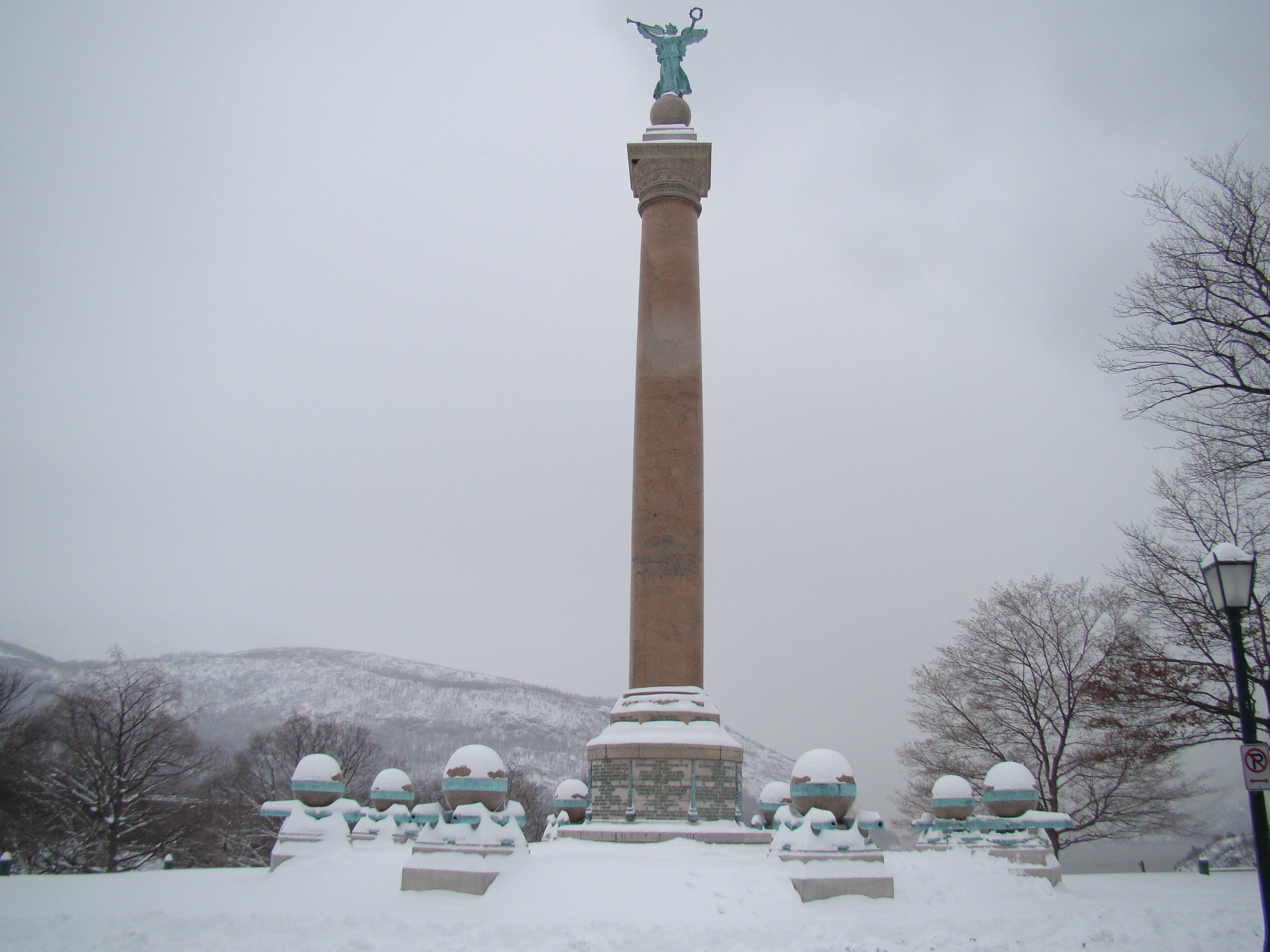
After heavy winter snow

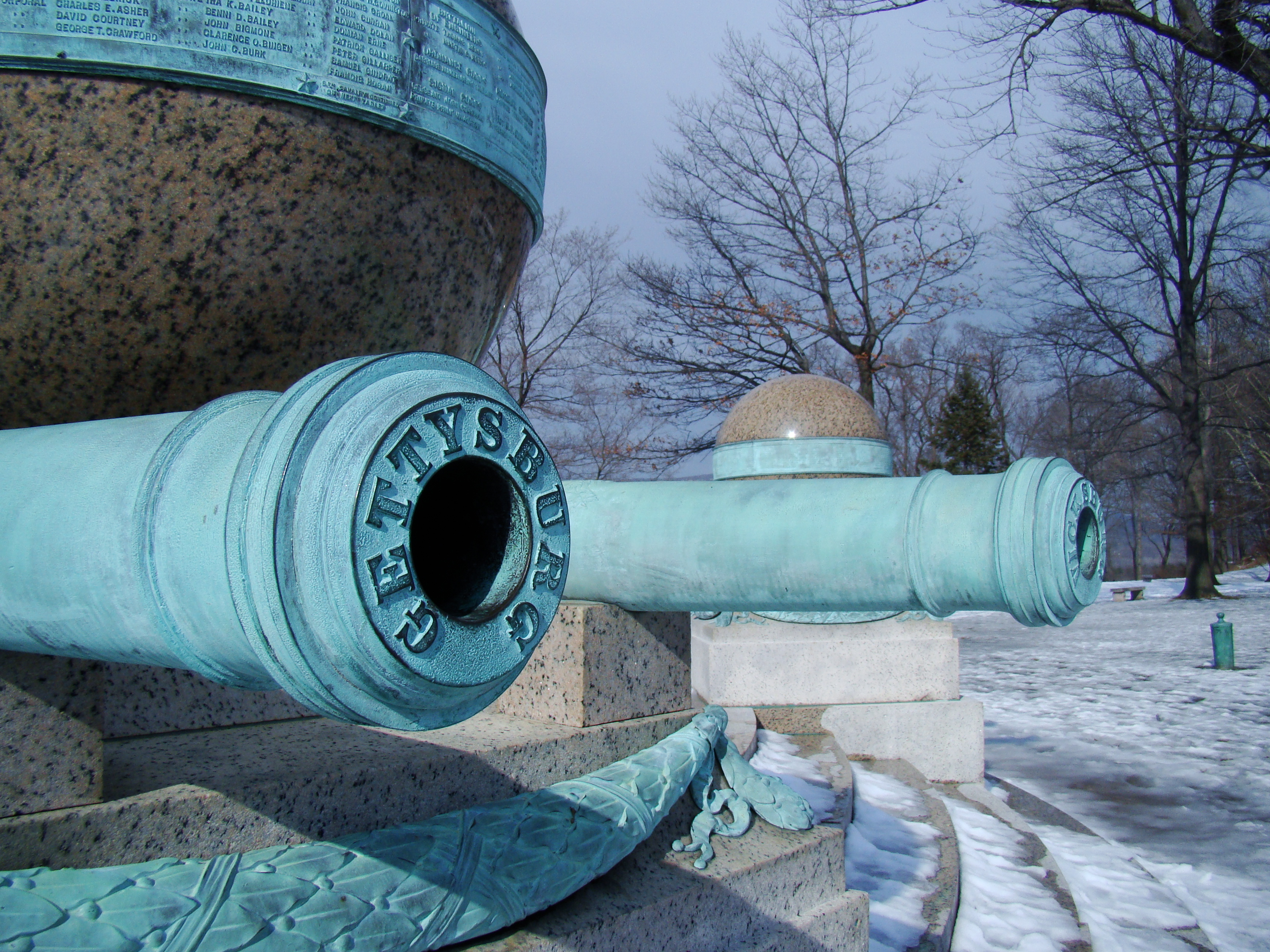
The cannons bear the names of major Civil War battles

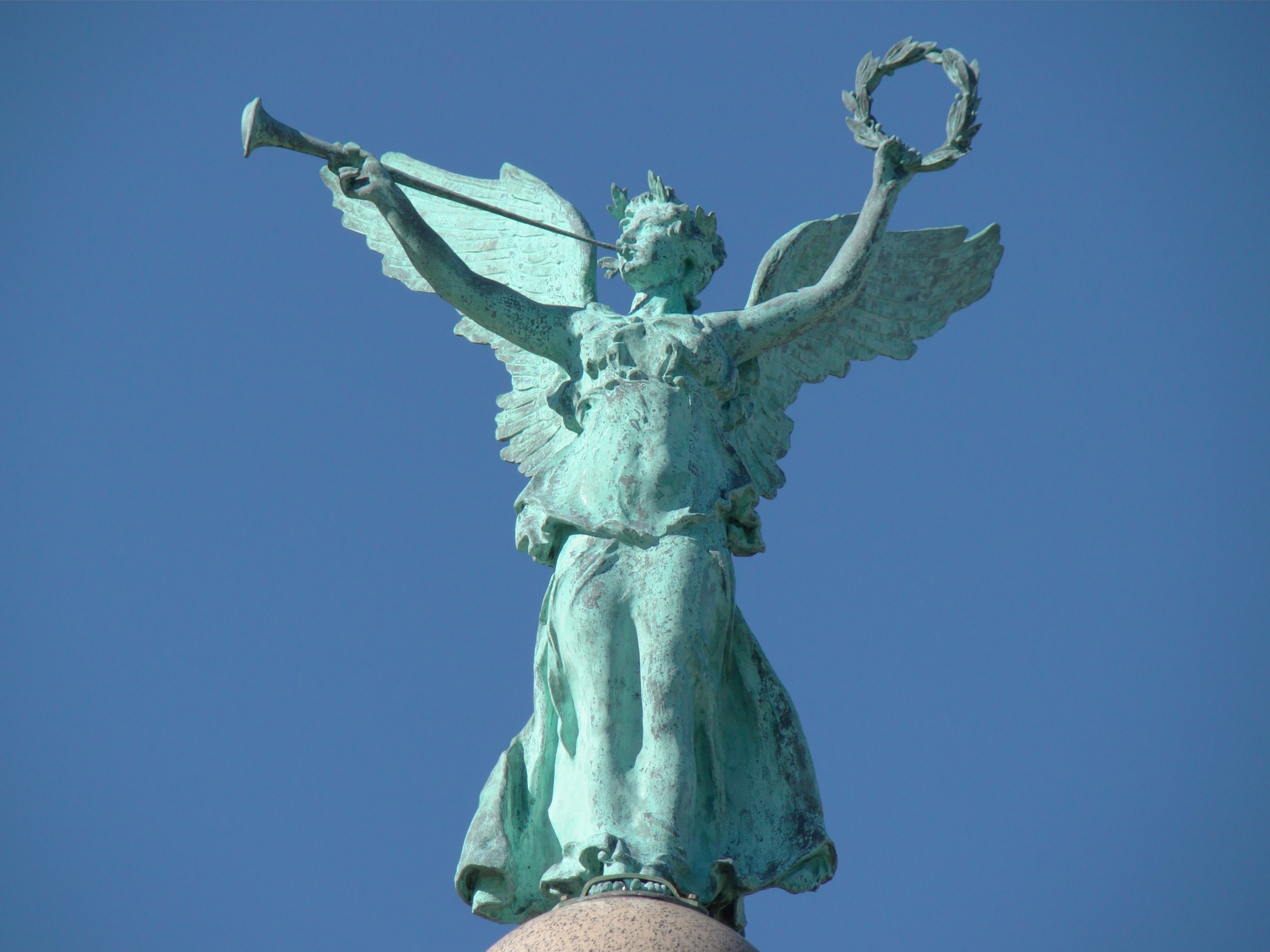
Statue of Fame atop the monument

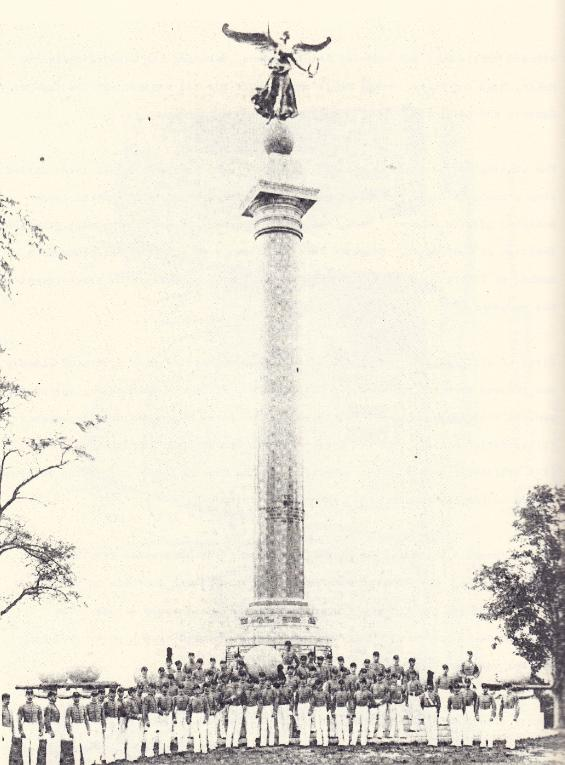
Original statue in 1897

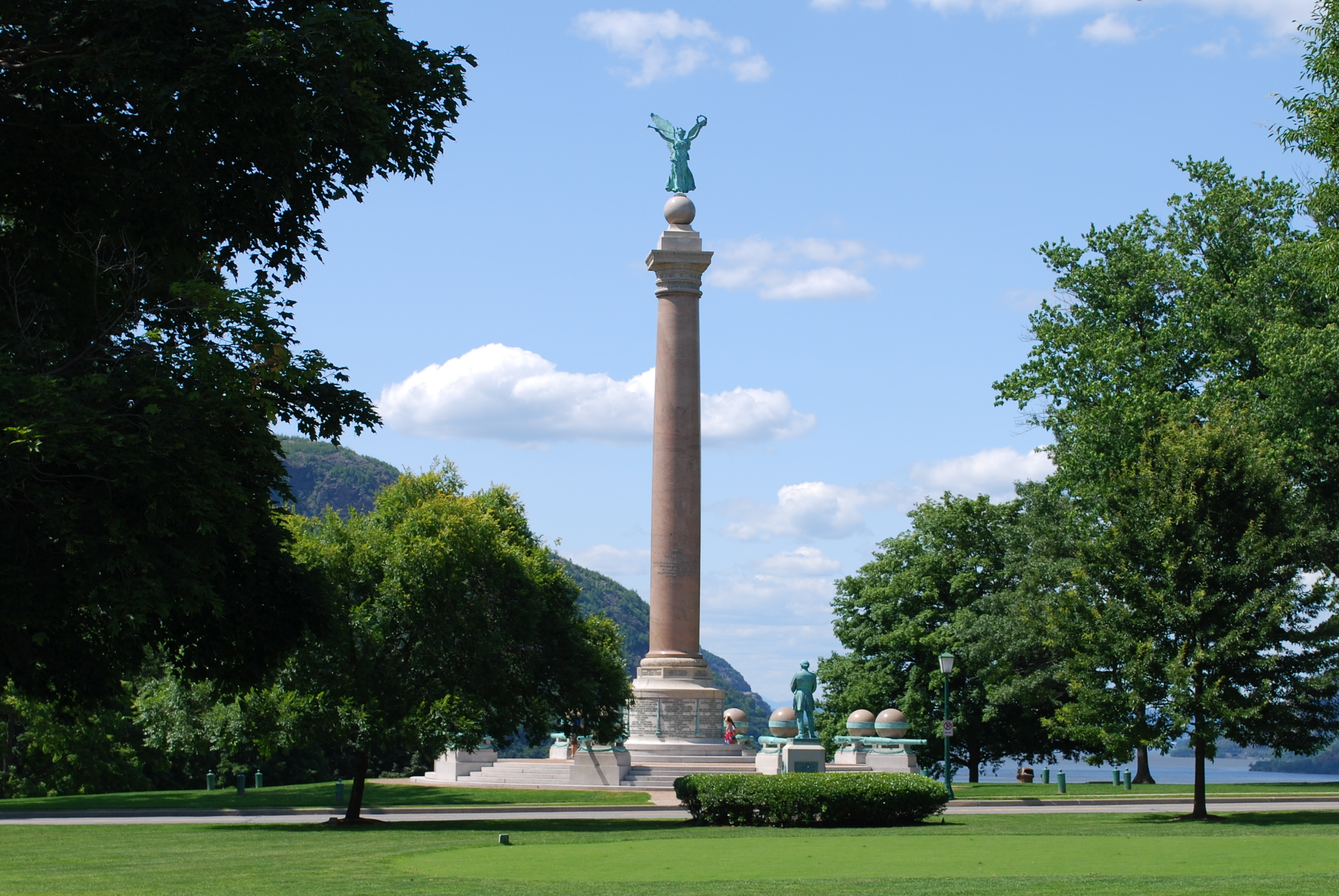
Summer 2009

== Sources ==
- Crackel, Theodore (1991). The Illustrated History of West Point. Boston: Harry N. Abrams, Inc. ISBN 0-8109-3458-2.
- Lea, Russel (2003). W.P. Bicentrivia. Haverford, PA: Infinity Publishing Co. ISBN 0-7414-1460-0.
