= History of the United States Military Academy =

The history of the United States Military Academy can be traced to fortifications constructed on the West Point of the Hudson River during the American Revolutionary War in 1778. Following the war, President Thomas Jefferson signed legislation establishing the United States Military Academy (USMA) on the site in 1802. In 1817 the academy was transformed by the appointment of Sylvanus Thayer who drastically reformed the curriculum.

== Revolutionary War and founding ==
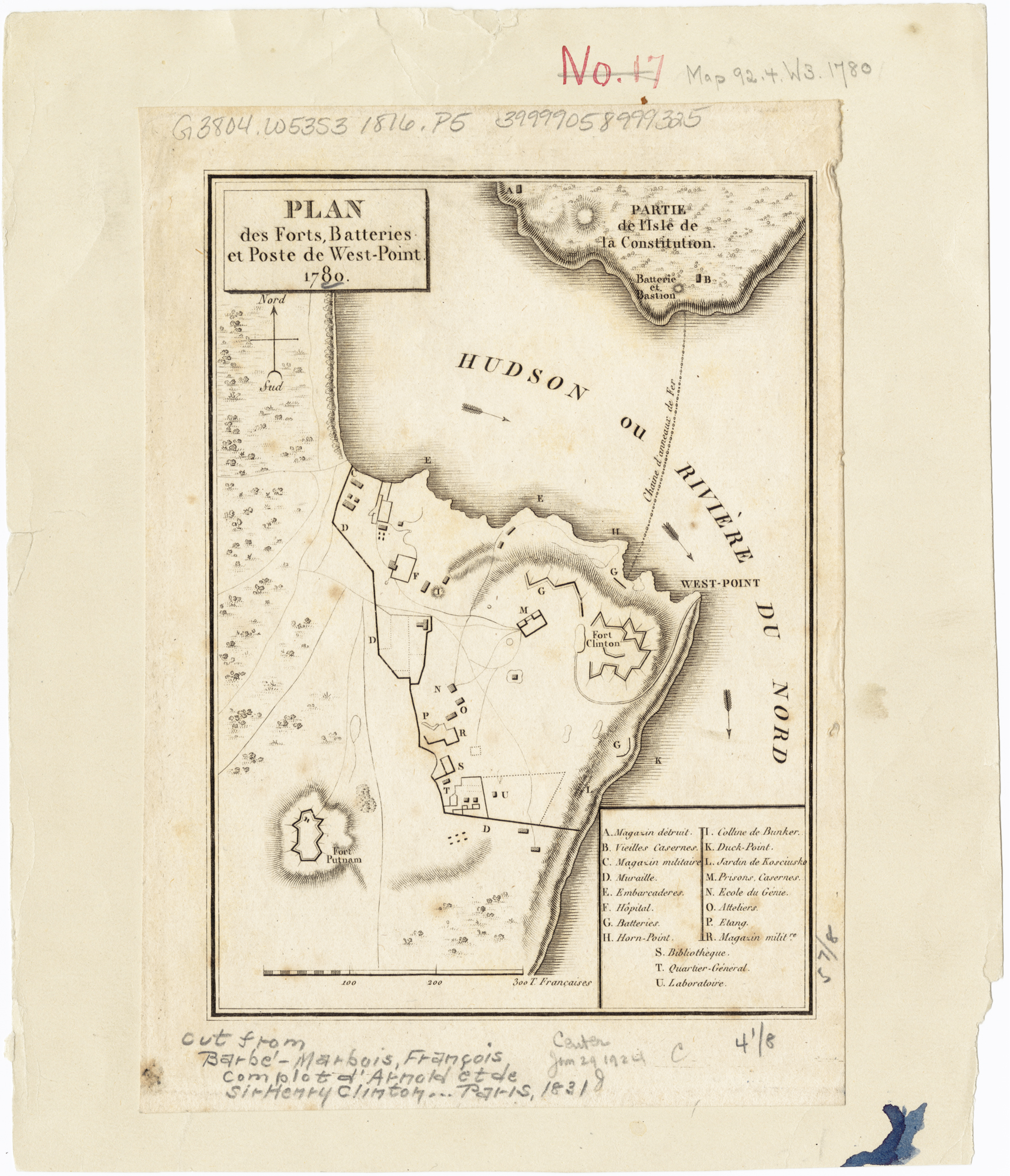
West Point, 1780

The harsh winter of 1777–1778 froze the Hudson River, allowing elements of the Connecticut militia under the command of General Samuel Holden Parsons to march westward across the river. They first occupied West Point on 27 January 1778, making it the longest continually occupied post in the United States. At George Washingtons request, it was Friedrich Wilhelm von Steuben, who created a blueprint for the future of the U.S. Military, including the establishment, framework, and curriculum for America's service academies, starting with West Point. George Washington considered West Point to be the most important military position in America, stationing his headquarters there in the summer and fall of 1779. After his victory over the British Army at the Battle of Yorktown, Washington kept the Continental Army garrisoned nearby at New Windsor at the New Windsor Cantonment until the official end of the war. The original owner of the land at West Point was a General Stephen Moore of North Carolina. The Continental Army occupied his land for twelve years until Secretary of the Treasury Alexander Hamilton authorized the purchase of the land for $11,085 in 1790.

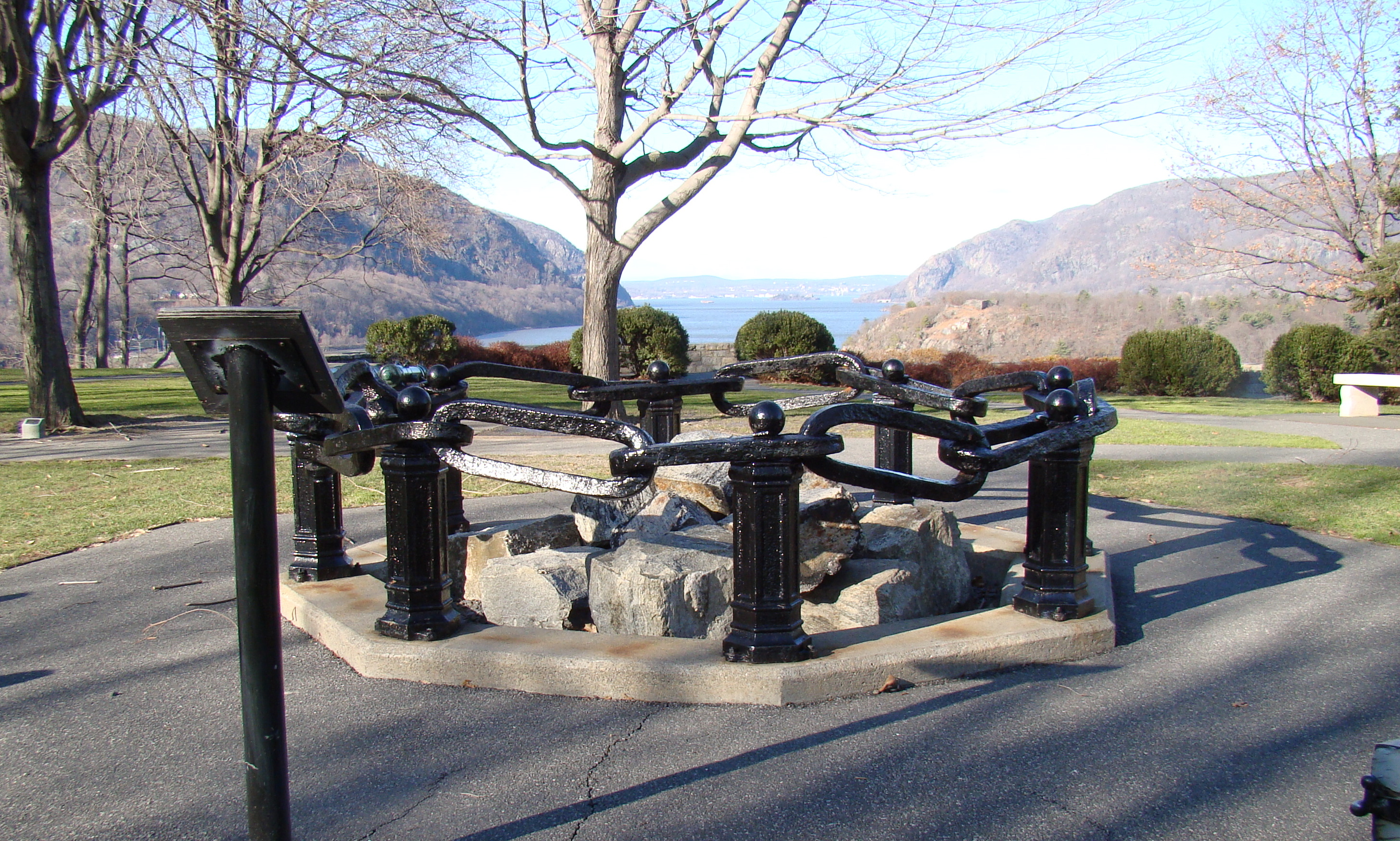
Remnants of the Great Chain

Between 1778 and 1780, Polish engineer and military hero Tadeusz Kościuszko oversaw the construction of the garrison's defenses. Kościuszko's small garden retreat still stands today as Kosciuszko's Garden. The Great Chain and high ground above the narrow "S" curve in the Hudson River enabled the Continental Army to prevent British ships from sailing up river and dividing the Colonies. Because of the unique bend in the river, ships of the day had to slow down to a near complete stop to navigate the turn. Though never tested, the chain performed its purpose by preventing British movement up river. Several forts and redoubts were constructed to defend this turn in the river. The closest to the river was Fort Clinton, formerly named Fort Arnold for his victory at Saratoga in 1777. The remains of this fort can be seen on the western edge of the Plain between Thayer Road and the Hudson River. A few hundred feet higher in elevation was Fort Putnam, near the site of the present day Michie Stadium. A series of smaller redoubts protected these two forts. Several are still visible, including Redoubt Four, at the highest point on the academy, and Redoubt Seven, across the river on Constitution Island. It was as commander of the fortifications at West Point that Benedict Arnold committed his infamous act of treason when he attempted to sell the fort to the British.

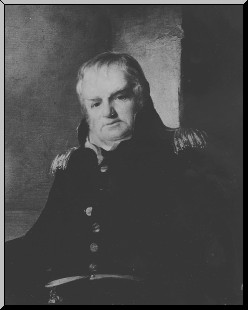
Jonathan Williams

The academy can trace its earliest roots to the 1776 Continental Congress authorization of the establishment of a "Corps of Invalids". This organization would "give service to disabled officers" with one its missions being to impart "military knowledge to 'young gentlemen'". This "Corps" moved to the garrison at West Point in 1781, but few officers reported for duty and it was disbanded after the end of the war in 1783. In the years immediately following the Revolutionary War, West Point was the largest post in the army, with more than half of the approximately 100 authorized men in the entire army stationed there.

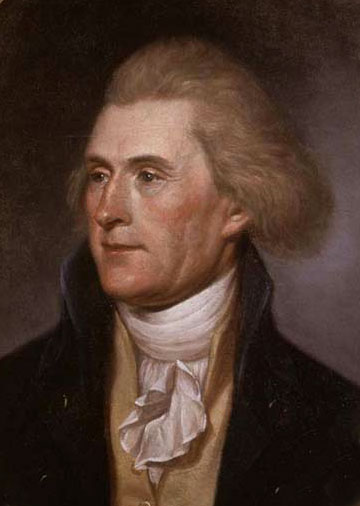
Thomas Jefferson

During his presidency, George Washington saw a need for a national military academy to teach the art and science of war, but his Secretary of State Thomas Jefferson argued that there was no provision in the Constitution that allowed for the creation of a military academy. Many in the Congress also feared establishing a Military Academy as too aristocratic. In 1794, Congress authorized the establishment of a "Corps of Artillerist and Engineers" at West Point, though an official course of study was not firmly established until well after the formal founding of the academy in 1802. Despite Washington's support for the founding of an academy, his presidency, and that of his successor, failed to produce a formal academy. American military failures in frontier-fighting such as the Battle of the Wabash and the Quasi-War with France motivated Congress to authorize president John Adams to improve the instruction at West Point, but little resulted due to a lack of qualified instructors. By the time Adams left office in 1801, the Corps consisted of only twelve cadets and one instructor.

Despite his earlier misgivings, when Jefferson became president, he called for and signed legislation establishing a "Corps of Engineers" which "shall be stationed at West Point and constitute a Military Academy" on 16 March 1802. Jefferson wanted a "national university" that focused on science and engineering and was looking for an American with a strong scientific background to command the academy. In 1801, he found his man in Jonathan Williams. Though he had no previous military experience, Williams was a well-known scientist of his day, and a relative of Benjamin Franklin. Williams accepted Jefferson's appointment to the rank of Colonel and arrived to assume his post on 14 December 1801.

== Early years ==
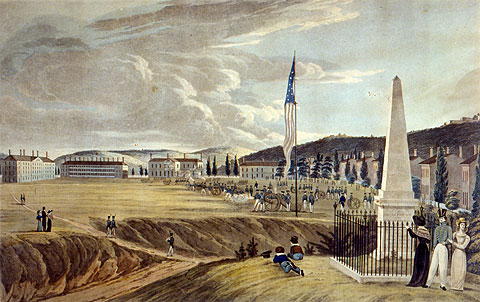
Academy in 1828. All structures depicted are now gone.

The first graduates of the academy were Joseph Gardner Swift and Simeon Magruder Levy, who graduated on 12 October 1802. Swift would later return as Superintendent from 1812 to 1814. Alden Partridge, an 1806 graduate, served as Professor of Mathematics and Engineering, and was Acting Superintendent on occasions from 1808 to 1813. Partridge served as Superintendent from 1814 to 1817, and was responsible for selecting the gray uniforms students still wear today. The early years of the academy were a tumultuous time, with few standards for admission or length of study. Cadets ranged in age from 10 to 37 and attended between 6 months to 6 years. The impending War of 1812 caused Congress to authorize a more formal system of education at the academy, and increased the size of the Corps of Cadets to 250. By the War of 1812, only 89 officers had graduated, morale was low, and the academy was in danger of being disbanded. 1811 graduate George Ronan, assigned to duty at Fort Dearborn on the American frontier, was killed in the War of 1812 and became the first member of the Corps of Cadets to die in combat. Alden Partridge was accused of lax management and resigned his commission in 1818, unhappy at turning the Superintendent's position over to Sylvanus Thayer, who had been one of Partridge's students. Partridge went on to found Norwich University.

== Thayer and his changes ==
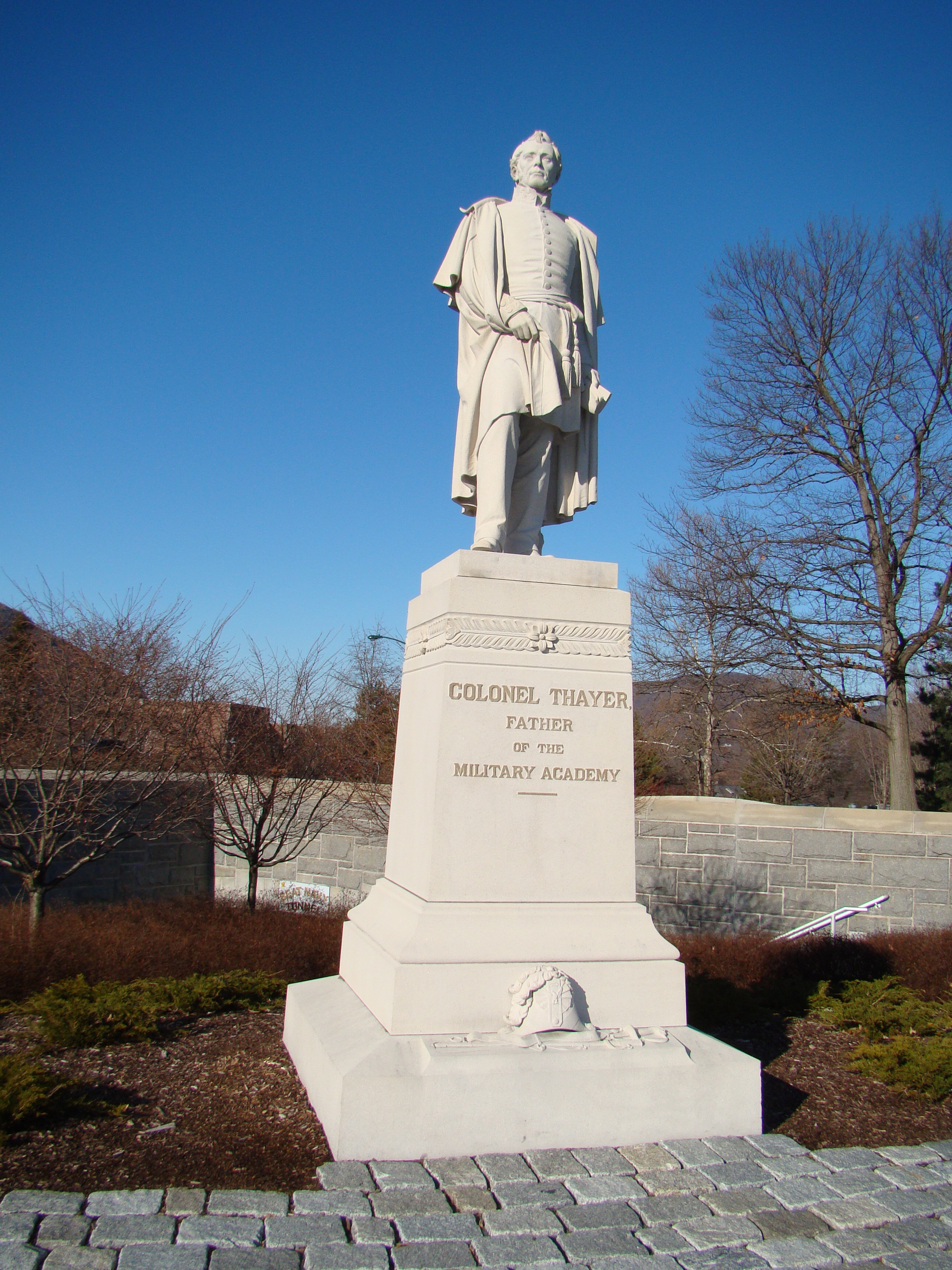
Thayer Statue

In 1817, Colonel Sylvanus Thayer became the superintendent. He is known as the "Father of the Military Academy." He upgraded academic standards, instilled military discipline, and emphasized honorable conduct. He also created a teaching method known today as the Thayer Method, which emphasizes self study and daily homework, as well as small class size. This method of instruction is still used today. Thayer made civil engineering the foundation of the curriculum. For the first half century, USMA graduates were largely responsible for the construction of the bulk of the nation's initial railway lines, bridges, harbors and roads. This tradition continues in the hands of the U.S. Army Corps of Engineers. Thayer was responsible for forging many of the traditions and culture that are the essence of the academy even in modern times. During his tenure, the Corps of Cadets thrived and due to the small size of the Regular Army during this period of American history, USMA became the predominant source of commissioned officers. This led to an increase in the esprit-de-corps and honoring of tradition that is so ingrained in West Point culture. The tradition of the class ring began during Thayer's tenure, in 1835 – the first such university in the US to do so.

== After Thayer until the war with Mexico ==
After the tenure of Thayer, the academy faced challenges to its relevance as many new Western State congressmen saw it as a breeding ground for an elitist aristocratic Officer Corps. The War with Mexico, 1846–1848, changed the nation's perception of the academy. Because of the Army's slow promotion system of the time, no graduate of the academy had made general officer rank at the start of the war. However, many junior and mid-level officer graduates proved themselves invaluable in battle. Generals Ulysses S. Grant and Robert E. Lee first distinguished themselves in battle in Mexico. In all 452 of 523 West Point graduates who served in the war received battlefield promotions or awards for bravery.

== Mexican War until the Civil War ==
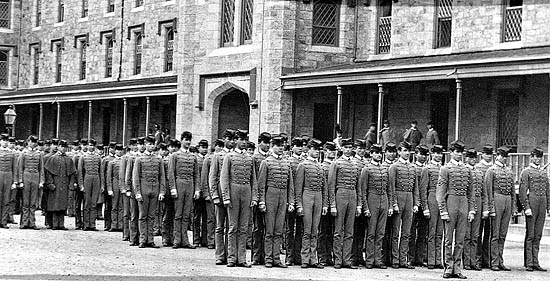
The Corps of Cadets, circa 1870s

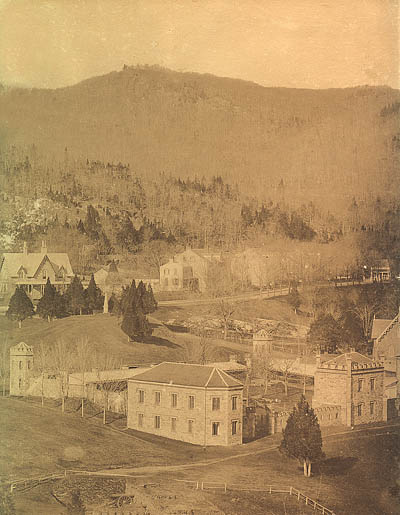
Dean's House and Professor Row in background, circa 1870

Robert E. Lee (class of 1829) was the Superintendent from 1852 to 1857. In 1857, West Point began the current process of admitting candidates nominated by the members of the United States Congress, one for each congressional district. The 1850s saw a modernization of many sorts at West Point, and this era was often romanticized by the graduates who led both sides of the Civil War as the "end of the Old West Point era". New barracks brought better heat and gas lighting, while new ordnance and tactics training incorporated new rifle and musket technology and advancement such as the steam engine. With the outbreak of the Civil War, West Point graduates filled the general officer ranks of the rapidly expanding Confederate and Union armies. Two hundred ninety four graduates served as general officers for the Union, and 151 served as general officers for the Confederacy. An astounding 10% of all graduates (105) were killed in action during the war, and another 15% (151) were wounded in action. Nearly every general officer of note from either side during the Civil War was a graduate of West Point.

== Post–Civil War until Spanish–American War ==
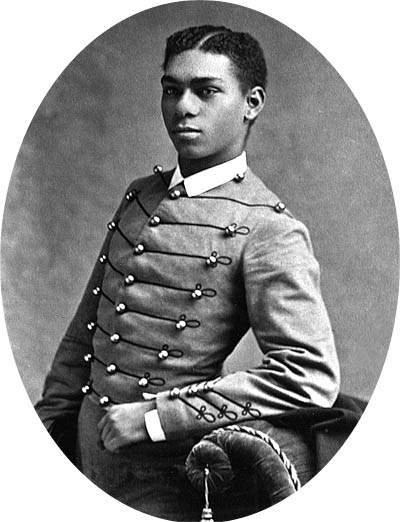
Henry O. Flipper

The years immediately following the American Civil War were a difficult time for the academy as it struggled to admit and reintegrate cadets from former Confederate states. The first cadets from Southern states were re-admitted in 1868, and 1870 saw the admission of the first African-American cadet, James Webster Smith of South Carolina. Smith did not graduate, so Henry O. Flipper of Georgia become the first African-American graduate in 1877, graduating 50th of a class of 77. In the 35 years between the Civil War and 1900, the academy admitted 12 African American cadets with three graduating. Despite the low graduation rate, the admittance of African-American cadets at all to West Point was unusual and progressive for the country as a whole during this time. The post Civil War Era also saw a shift in the academy's curriculum from being very focused upon engineering to a more broad education. The control of the academy was changed from the Corps of Engineers to the Secretary of War, and for the first time, Superintendents were not from the Engineer Branch. As the "Gilded Age" saw a blossoming of liberal arts education in the private sector, West Point struggled to adapt and change its engineering-heavy curriculum to match the times. 1875, Willard Young, son of Mormon leader and pioneer, Brigham Young, became the first Latter-day Saint to graduate. Other more notable graduates during this period were George Washington Goethals from the Class of 1880 and John J. Pershing from the Class of 1886. Goethals would gain notoriety as the chief engineer of the Panama Canal and Pershing would become famous for chasing the famed Pancho Villa on the Mexican border and for leading American Forces during World War I. The outbreaks of the Spanish–American War and the Philippine–American War saw the classes of 1899 and 1901 graduate early, the first such classes to do so.

== 1900 to World War I ==
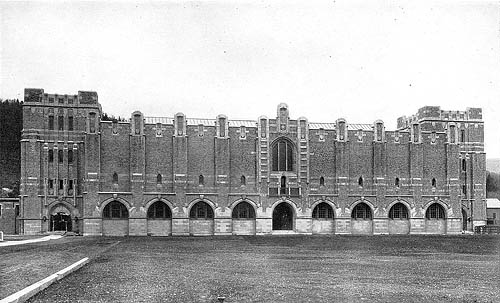
Hayes Gym built in 1910, still in use 2008

The wars in Cuba at the turn of the 20th century spurred Congress to authorize an increase in the size of the Corps of Cadets to 481 in 1900. The period between 1900 and 1915 saw a construction boom as much of West Point's old infrastructure was torn down and rebuilt. A new administration building, barracks, academic building, riding hall, gymnasium, and a cadet chapel were all completed by 1914. In 1916, Congress increased the size of the Corps of Cadets to 1,332. Many of the most famous graduates in the 20th century graduated during the 15-year period between 1900 and 1915: Douglas MacArthur (1903), Joseph Stilwell (1904), Henry "Hap" Arnold (1907), George S. Patton (1909), Dwight D. Eisenhower & Omar Bradley (both 1915) all graduated during this time. The Class of 1915 is known as the "Class the Stars Fell Upon" for the exceptionally high percentage of general officers (59 of the 164) that rose from that class. This period also saw the infancy of intercollegiate athletics at the academy. The Army-Navy football rivalry was born the decade before in 1890 with a victory by Navy at West Point, followed with Army's avenging that loss in Annapolis the following year. The academy's other major sports teams began play during this period. The outbreak of America's involvement in World War I caused a sharp increase in the demand for army officers, and the academy accelerated graduation of all four classes then in attendance to meet this requirement, beginning with the early graduation of the First Class on 20 April 1917, followed by the Second Class in August 1917, and graduation of both the Third and Fourth Classes just before the Armistice of 11 November 1918, when only freshman cadets remained (those who had entered in the summer of 1918). In all, wartime contingencies and post-war adjustments resulted in ten classes, varying in length of study from two to four years, within a seven-year period before the regular course of study was fully resumed.

== Between the world wars ==
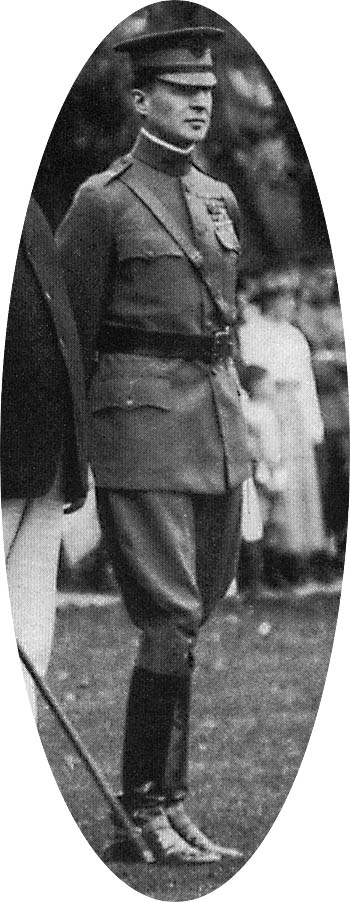
Douglas MacArthur as superintendent

The Interwar years saw the academy push to modernize to meet the demands of the emerging technologies in warfare. One of the academy's most distinguished graduates and a decorated WWI combat soldier and leader, Douglas MacArthur, became Superintendent in 1919. He instituted sweeping reforms to the academic process, introducing a greater emphasis on history and humanities. He began the process of having instructors study at civilian institutions prior to serving at West Point and he provided more liberal leave and pass opportunities to the upper classes. He made major changes to the field training regimen and the Cadet Honor Committee was formed under his watch in 1922. MacArthur was a firm supporter of athletics at the academy, as he famously said "Upon the fields of friendly strife are sown the seeds that, upon other fields, on other days, will bear the fruits of victory". West Point became an officially accredited institution with the Association of American Universities in 1925 and in 1933 officially began granting the title of Bachelor of Science to all graduates. It was also just prior to World War II that the academy expanded the reservation boundaries, growing to the nearly 15,000 acres (61 km^{2}) that it comprises today. In 1935, the United States Congress increased the Corps of Cadets to 1,960. As more cadets filled the barracks and classrooms, another building program was undertaken and completed by 1938.

== World War II to coeducation ==
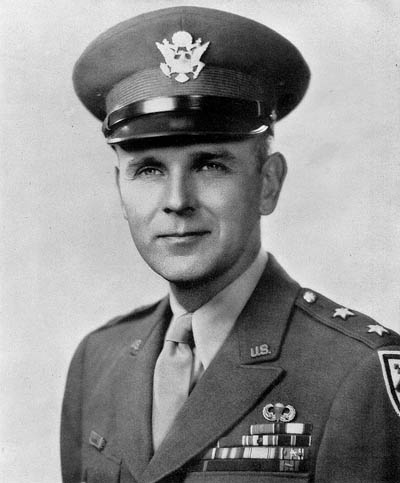
Maxwell Taylor as superintendent

Congress expanded the Corps of Cadets to 2,496 in 1942, and the academy reverted to a three-year course of study. The Class of 1943 was redesignated the Class of January 1943 and graduated six months early. Subsequent classes, from June 1943 through 1947, graduated in three years. The war years brought a greater emphasis on military training. In 1943, summer training was formally moved from the Plain to the new area recently acquired southwest of main post, which would later become Camp Buckner. Flight training was conducted at Stewart Field in Newburgh, and the academy graduated more than 1,000 commissioned pilots between 1943 and 1946. Nearly 500 graduates gave their lives in World War II. In 1945, Maxwell Taylor (class of 1922) became superintendent, ushering in the beginnings of the modern Military Academy. Taylor expanded the size of departments, added several new professors, abolished antiquated courses in fencing and horsemanship, inserted the study of amphibious operations into the military curriculum, and added courses in nuclear physics, electronics and communications. In response to Eisenhower's belief that American leaders needed to understand the psychology of the citizen soldier, courses were added in leadership and applied psychology. These changes provided graduates with a better understanding of how to motivate and lead the soldiers of a free society. Coursework in the humanities and social sciences increased to 40 percent of a cadet's total workload. When the Korean War began, the academy continued on a steady course and did not face major disruption from the conflict. The Korean War and an honor scandal in 1951 led to a decline in admissions, so that by 1954, only 67% of the academy's authorized strength was filled. The academy responded with its first modern advertising campaign." In 1955, the Hollywood motion picture The Long Gray Line, based upon another book by Colonel Reeder and his sister, was completed, and the CBS dramatic series The West Point Story aired on television. Colonel Russell "Red" Reeder, Class of 1926, wrote several popular novels about fictional West Point cadets which first appeared in 1955. A massive review of the curriculum led to the introduction of electives, growing from zero electives that a cadet could have in his career in the late 1950s, to a maximum of eight by 1972. The increasing sophistication of the curriculum also affected the organization of the academic departments with, for example, the creation of two new departments in 1969 -the Department of History and the Department of Engineering. In the 1960s, the size of the Corps expanded from 2,200 to 4,400. Following the creation of the U.S. Air Force as a separate service in 1947 and until the graduation of the first United States Air Force Academy class in 1959, West Point cadets who met the eligibility standards could apply to be commissioned as Air Force officers.

== Coeducation to present day ==
West Point first accepted women as cadets in 1976, when Congress authorized the admission of women to all of the federal service academies. Women comprise about 15 percent of entering plebes (freshmen); and they pursue the same academic and professional training as do their male classmates, except with different physical aptitude standards on the Army Physical Fitness Test (APFT) and the Indoor Obstacle Course Test (IOCT). In addition, women take boxing during plebe year physical education, just as the men do. The first class with female cadets graduated in 1980. In 1989, Kristen Baker became the first female first captain at West Point. As of May 2018, five females have been appointed as the first captain: Kristen Baker in 1989, Grace H. Chung in 2004, Stephanie Hightower in 2006, Lindsey Danilak in 2014, and Simone Askew in 2018. In 1995, Rebecca Marier became the academy's first female valedictorian. The first female West Point alumna to attain flag (general officer) rank was Rebecca Halstead, class of 1981. She was promoted to brigadier general in 2005 and served as the Army's Chief of Ordnance before retiring in 2008. Vincent Brooks became the first African-American first captain in 1980.

In 1985, cadets' number of authorized electives rose from 8 to 10 and they were allowed to declare a major, as all previous graduates had been awarded a Bachelor of Science with no major concentration. Because of the still-heavy emphasis upon math and science in all cadets' core course load, all cadets are still granted a Bachelor of Science upon graduation, even those who major in a liberal arts field of study. 1990 saw a major revision of the "Fourth Class System", as the Cadet Leader Development System (CLDS) became the guidance for the development of all four classes. West Point was an early adopter of the use of the Internet, authorizing full access to all cadets free of charge in their barracks room in 1996. The academy has received numerous awards for its high level of use of the Internet to conduct daily activities. From 1990 to 1994 West Point granted a total of 59 master's degrees as part of the Eisenhower Scholar Program for new tactical officers. This is the only time in history a U.S. service academy has granted graduate level diplomas. This program still exists, but has since been restructured so that the degrees are granted on behalf of Columbia University, and not West Point.

== Academy coat of arms ==

Designed in 1898 by Professors Larned, Bass, and Tillman, the original design was nearly identical to the current, but was oriented to the right. In 1923, the coat of arms was oriented to the left to conform to more traditional conventions of heraldry. Some of the older buildings on post still bear the original, right-oriented version. The shield is topped by the American bald eagle and the academy's motto of "Duty, Honor, Country" and "West Point MDCCCII USMA" which is the date of USMA's founding. The helmet is that of Pallas Athena, for centuries a symbol of wisdom and learning. The sword is a traditional emblem of the military.
