= Redoubt Four (West Point) =

- Part of United States Military Academy
- West Point, New York
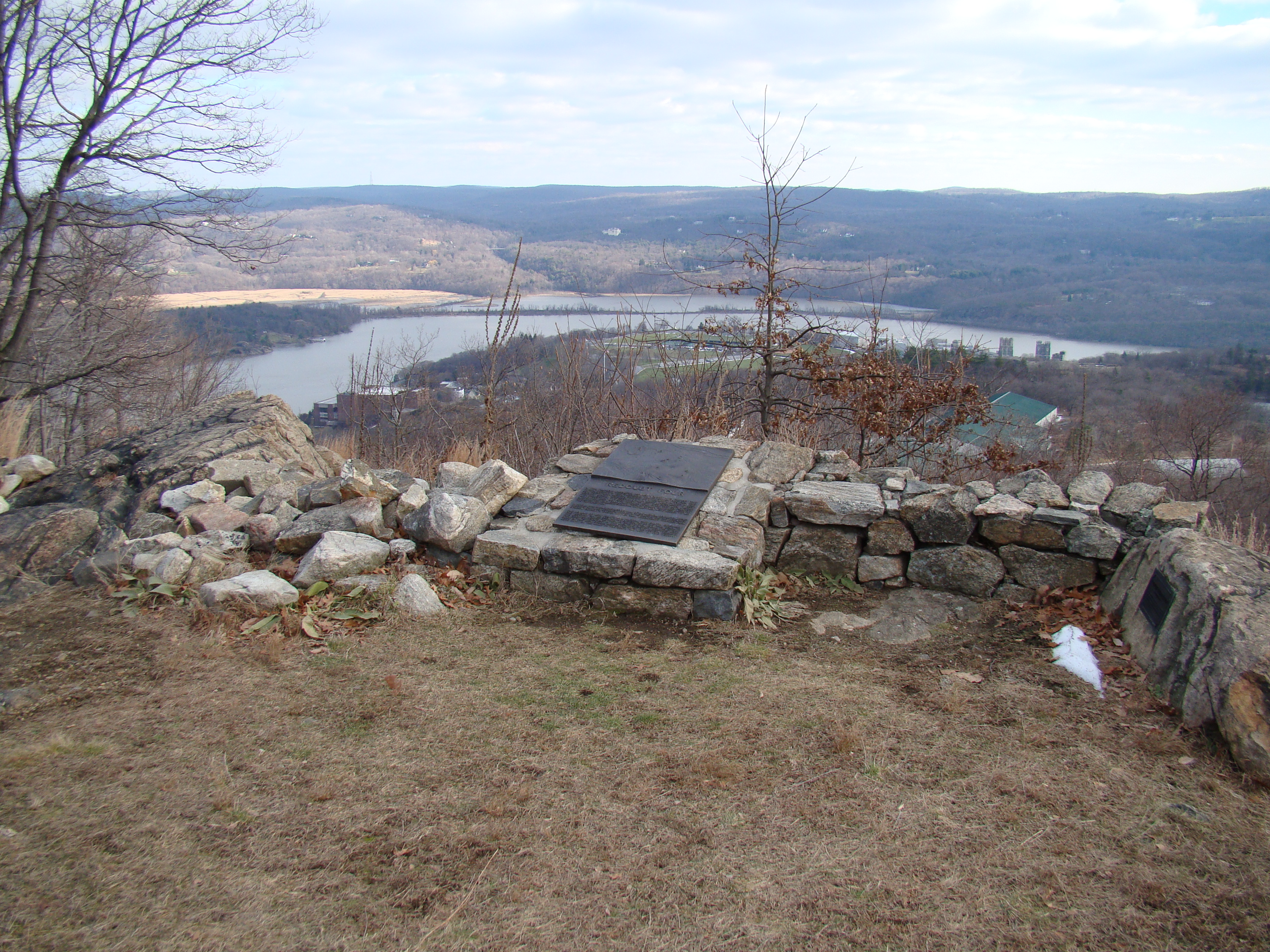
- View of the Hudson River and West Point from Redoubt Four

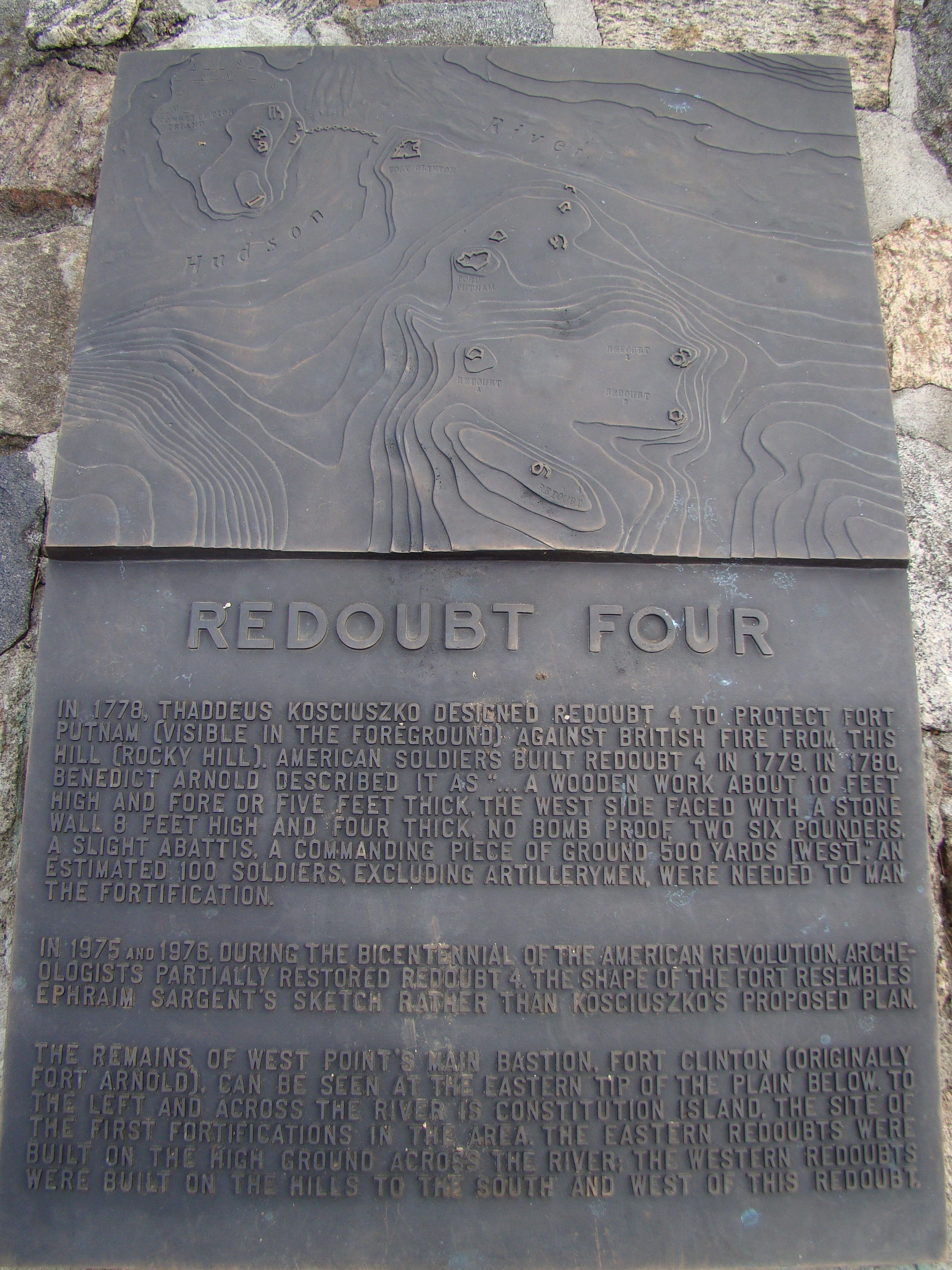

Site information
- Owner: United States Army
- Controlled by: US Army
- Open to the public: Year Round
- Condition: partially restored

Location
- Coordinates: 41°23′24.27″N 73°58′21.9″W

Site history
- Built: 1778
- Built by: Tadeusz Kosciuszko
- Battles/wars: Revolutionary War

Garrison information
- Garrison: West Point

Redoubt Four was a supporting defensive position of Fort Putnam during the Revolutionary War defensive network at West Point. It was constructed under the command of Tadeusz Kosciuszko in 1778-1779. During the war, it was a key defensive overwatch position for Fort Putnam 300 feet below, which was in turn the key overwatch position for Fort Clinton. According to Benedict Arnold, the fort required approximately 100 soldiers to man it. The redoubt was partially restored in 1975-1976 as part of the bicentennial celebration. It can be accessed by foot year round from Patrick Trail (road) approximately .5 miles from the West Point Post Exchange complex.

== Construction ==
"The possession of the Hill appears to me essential to the preservation of the whole post and our main effort ought to be directed to keeping the enemy off of it...", George Washington wrote in July 1779, vindicating Tadeusz Kościuszko's decision to place a redoubt on Rocky Hill.

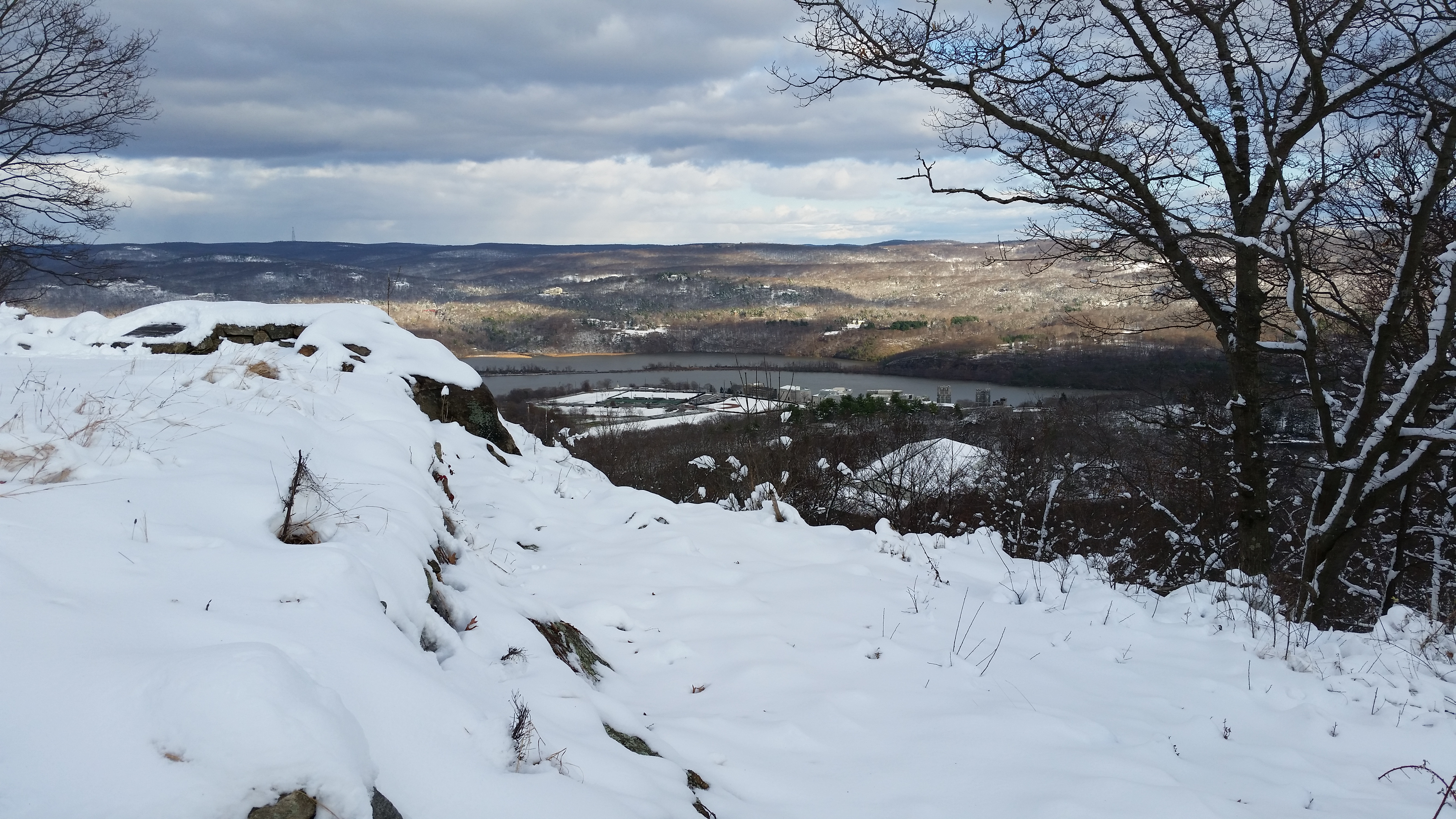
Redoubt Four commands the heights over West Point

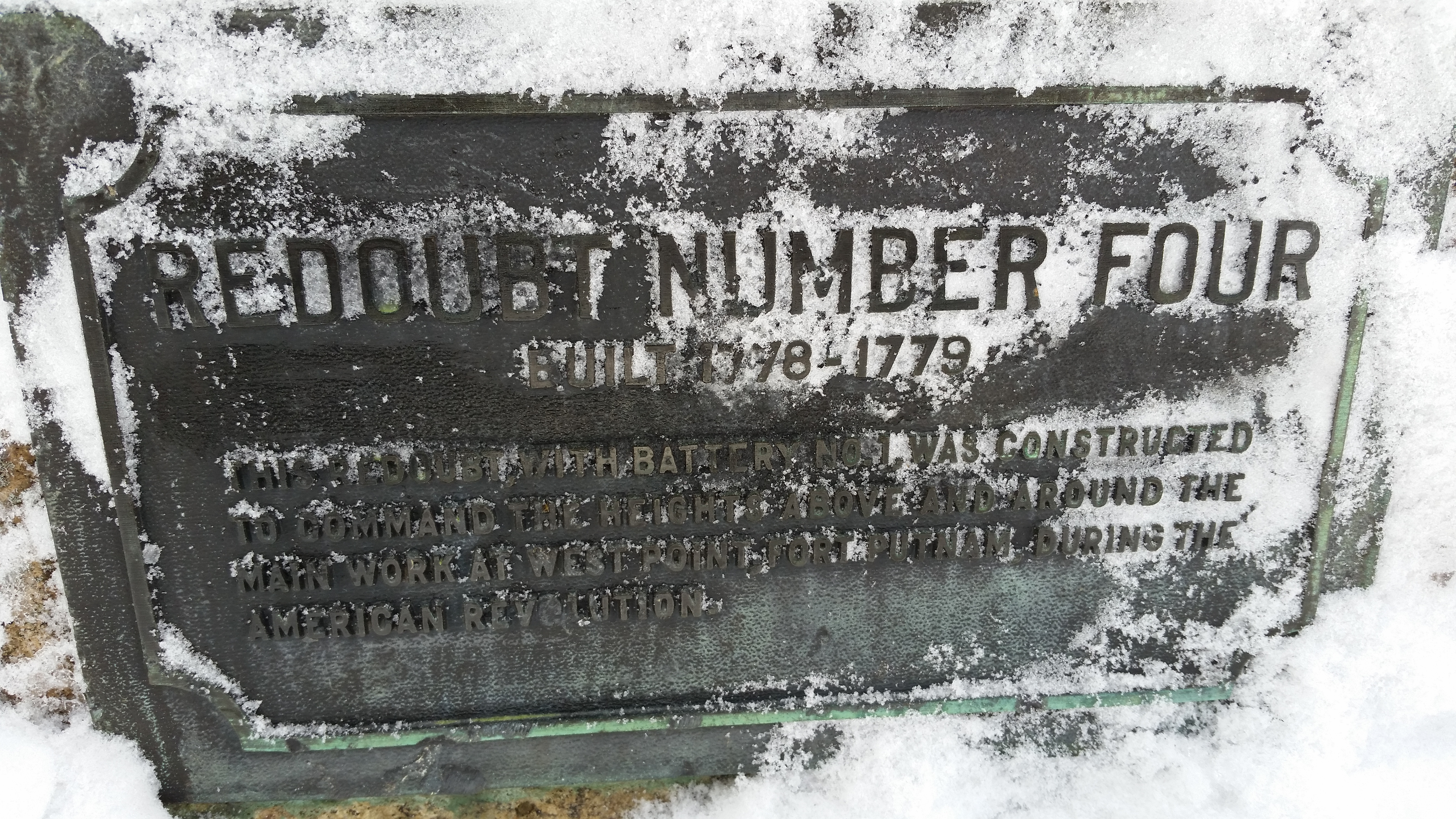
Redoubt Four marker

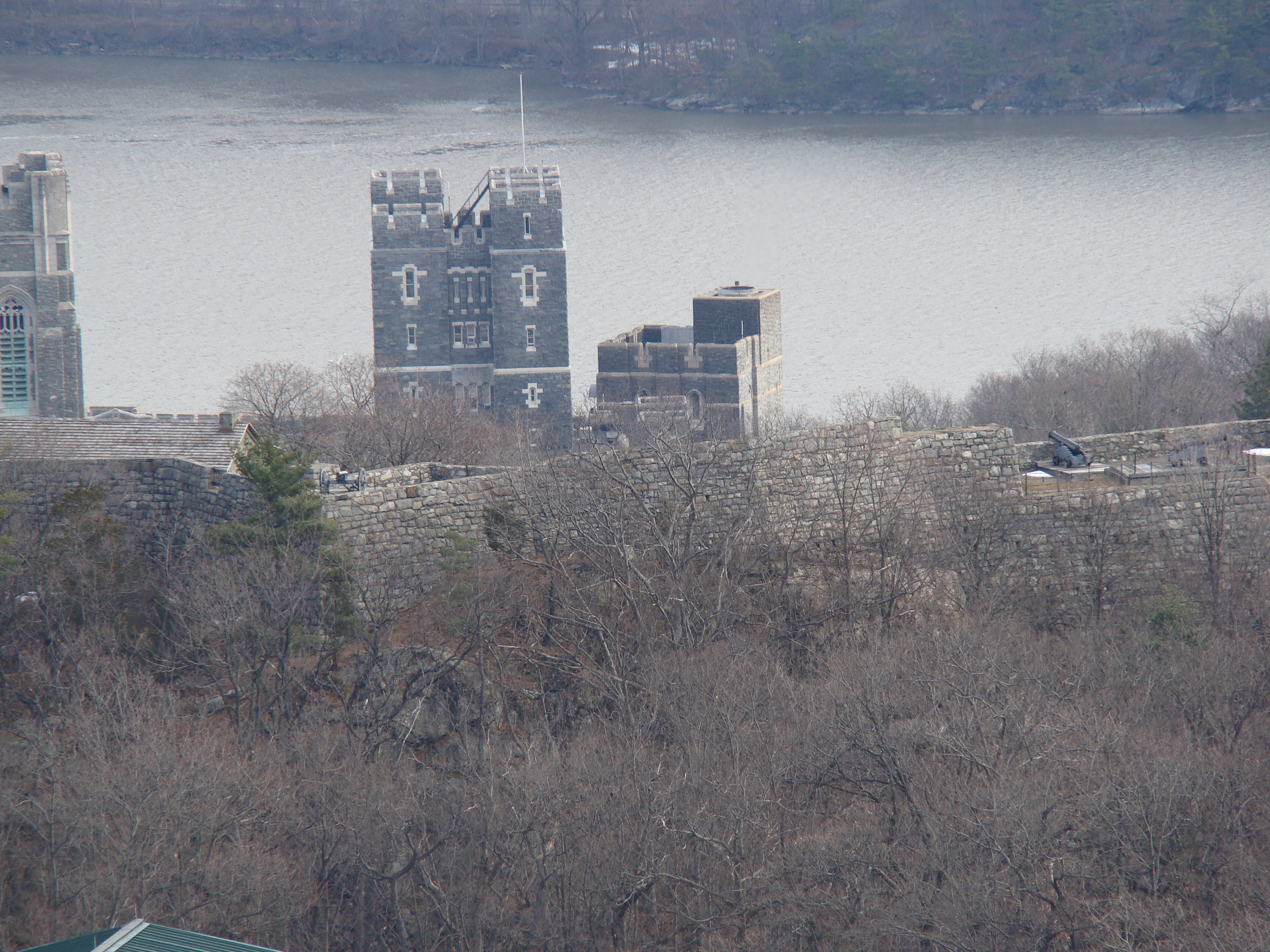
Fort Putnam viewed from Redoubt Four. The Cadet Chapel and Taylor Hall towers and Hudson River beyond the fort are actually hundreds of yards beyond

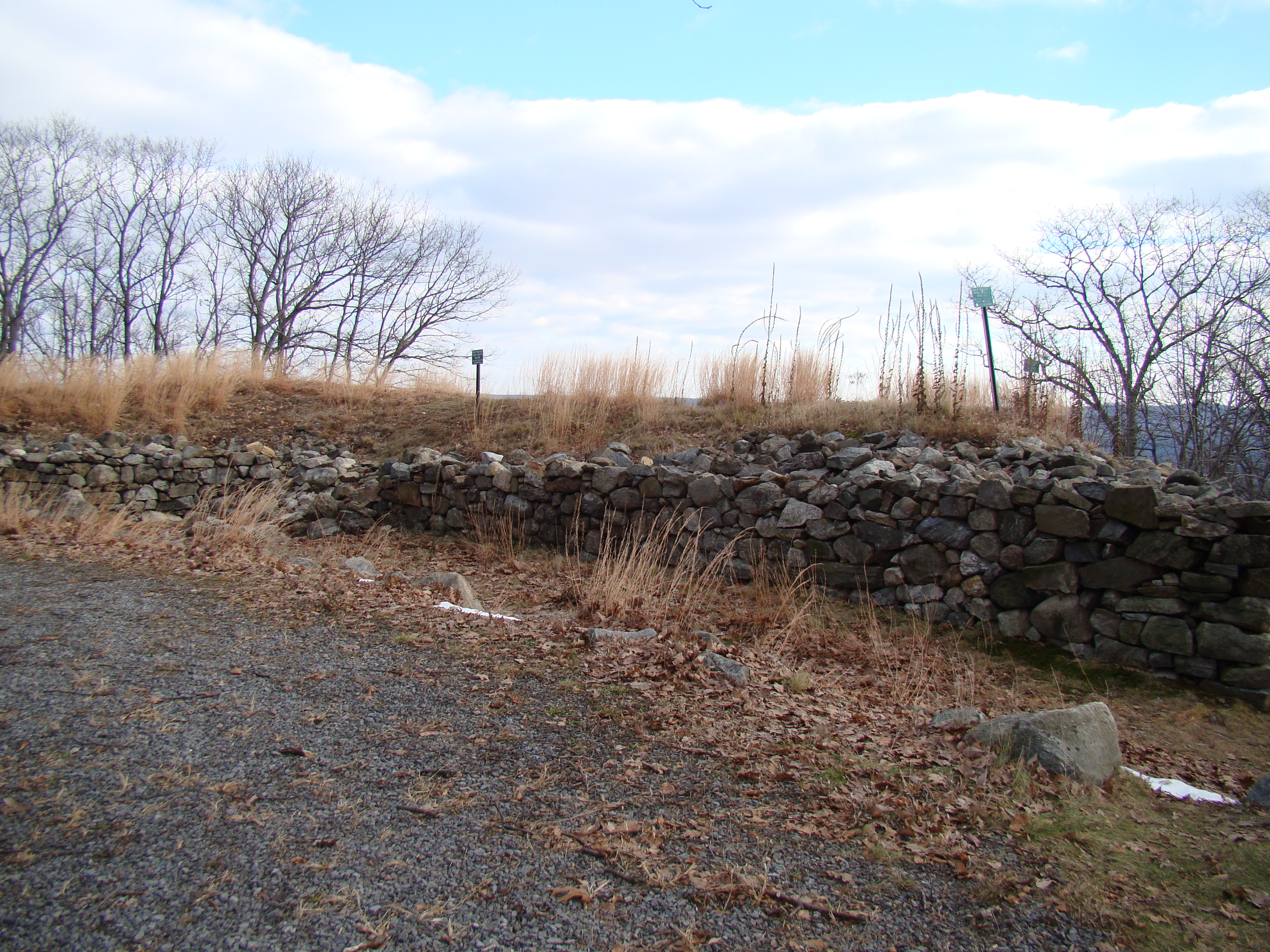
The partially restored eastern wall

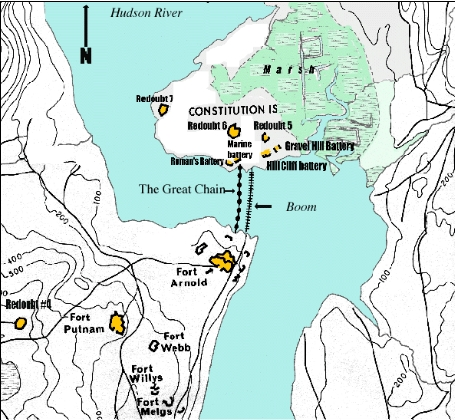
Map of West Point Fortifications

== See also ==
- Constitution Island
- Kosciuszko's Garden
