= Fort Putnam =

Coordinates: 41.390089°N 73.963923°W

- Part of United States Military Academy
- West Point, New York
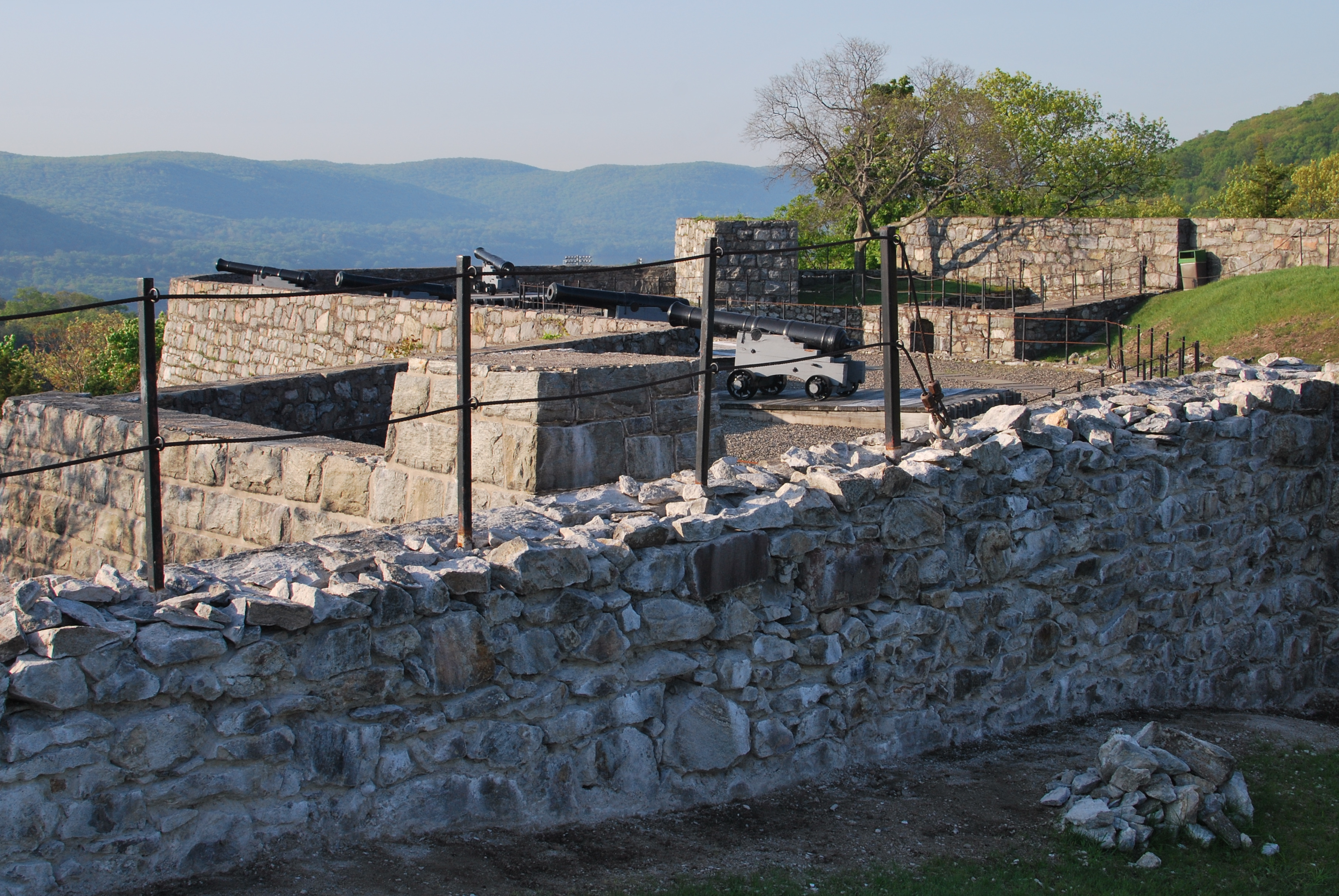
- The east wall and guns of Fort Putnam that face the Hudson River

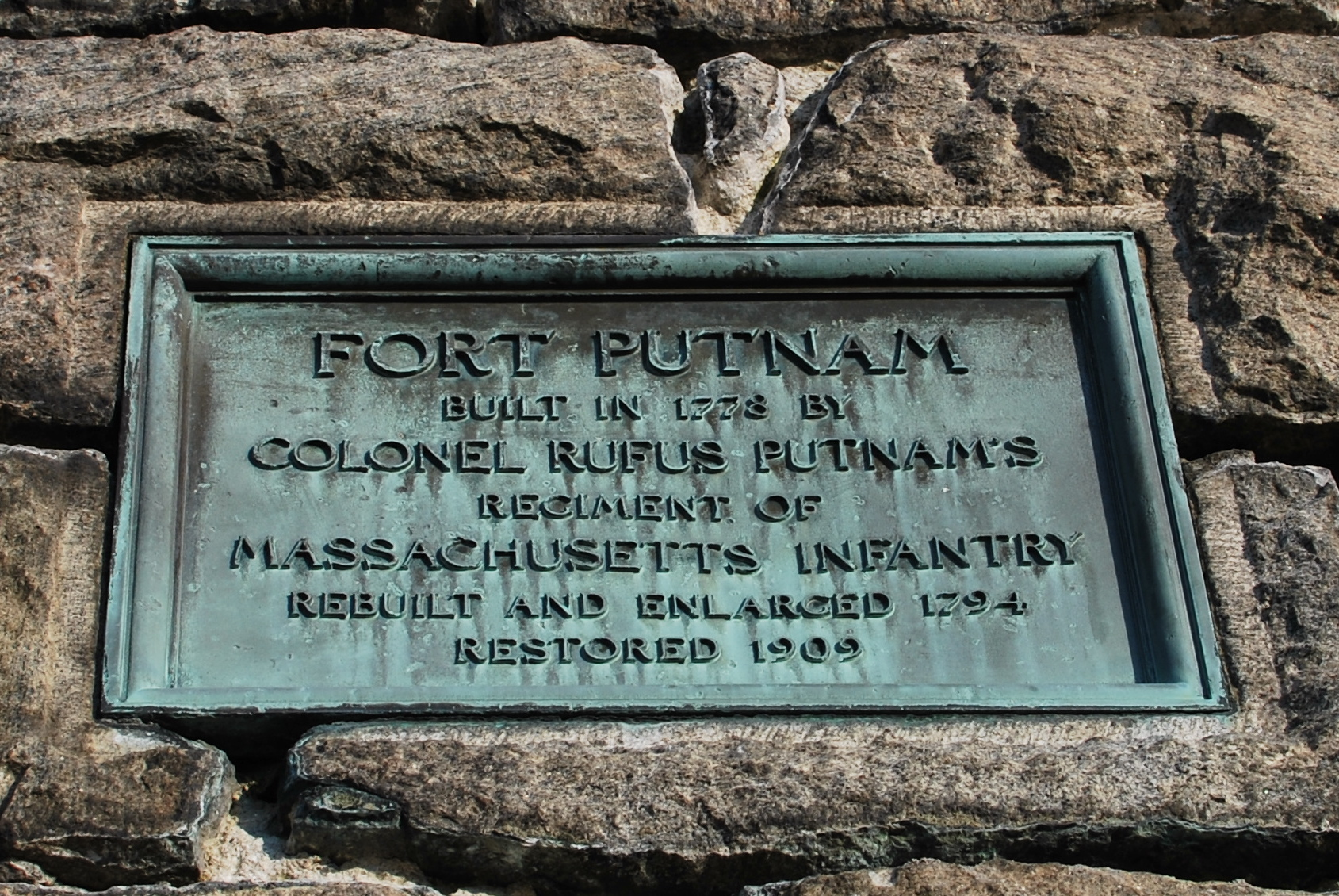

Site information
- Owner: United States Army
- Controlled by: US Army
- Open to the public: Late spring until mid-fall. Check with USMA Museum for access hours and dates
- Condition: restored

Site history
- Built: 1778
- Built by: Colonel Rufus Putnam
- Battles/wars: Revolutionary War

Garrison information
- Garrison: West Point

Fort Putnam was a military garrison during the Revolutionary War at West Point, New York, United States. Built by a regiment of Colonel Rufus Putnam's 5th Massachusetts Regiment, it was completed in 1778 with the purpose of supporting Fort Clinton, which sat on the edge of the Hudson River about 3/4 of a mile away. The fort was rebuilt and enlarged in 1794 before falling into disuse and disrepair as the military garrison at West Point became obsolete in the early mid-19th century. It underwent a major preservation as a historical site in 1909, and has been continually in the process of preservation since. Sitting at an elevation of 500 feet, it was West Point's largest garrison during the Revolutionary War. The Fort is under the supervision of the West Point Museum Director, David M. Reel, and is operated by the United States Army Garrison, West Point. Access to the Fort is seasonal and as summer staff are available.

== Construction ==
In 1778, Gen. Alexander McDougall wrote, "Genl. Parson, Clinton and Col. Delaradiere went with me to View the Rock & Crown Hills in the rear of our works..."(Fort Clinton). Tadeusz Kościuszko convinced them of the necessity of defending Crown Hill, and drafted blueprints accordingly. Gen. Israel Putnam's younger cousin, Col. Rufus Putnam, and three hundred men arrived on four sloops with lumber to build Fort Putnam. McDougall wrote, "The hill which Col. Putnam is fortifying is the most commanding and important of any that we can now attend to...the easternmost face of this work must be so constructed as to command the plain."

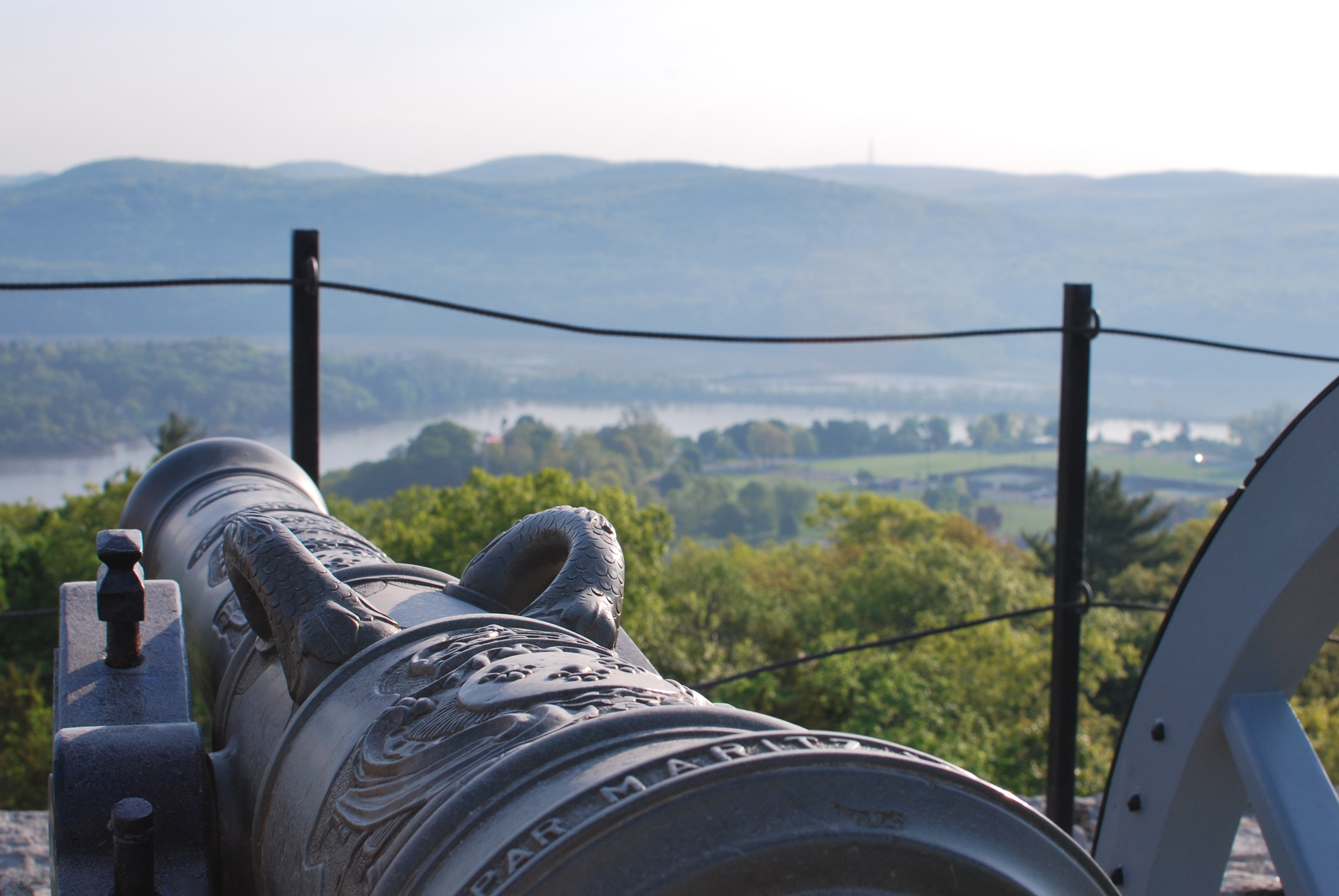
A cannon facing northeast towards Constitution Island (left) and the Plain and Fort Clinton (right)

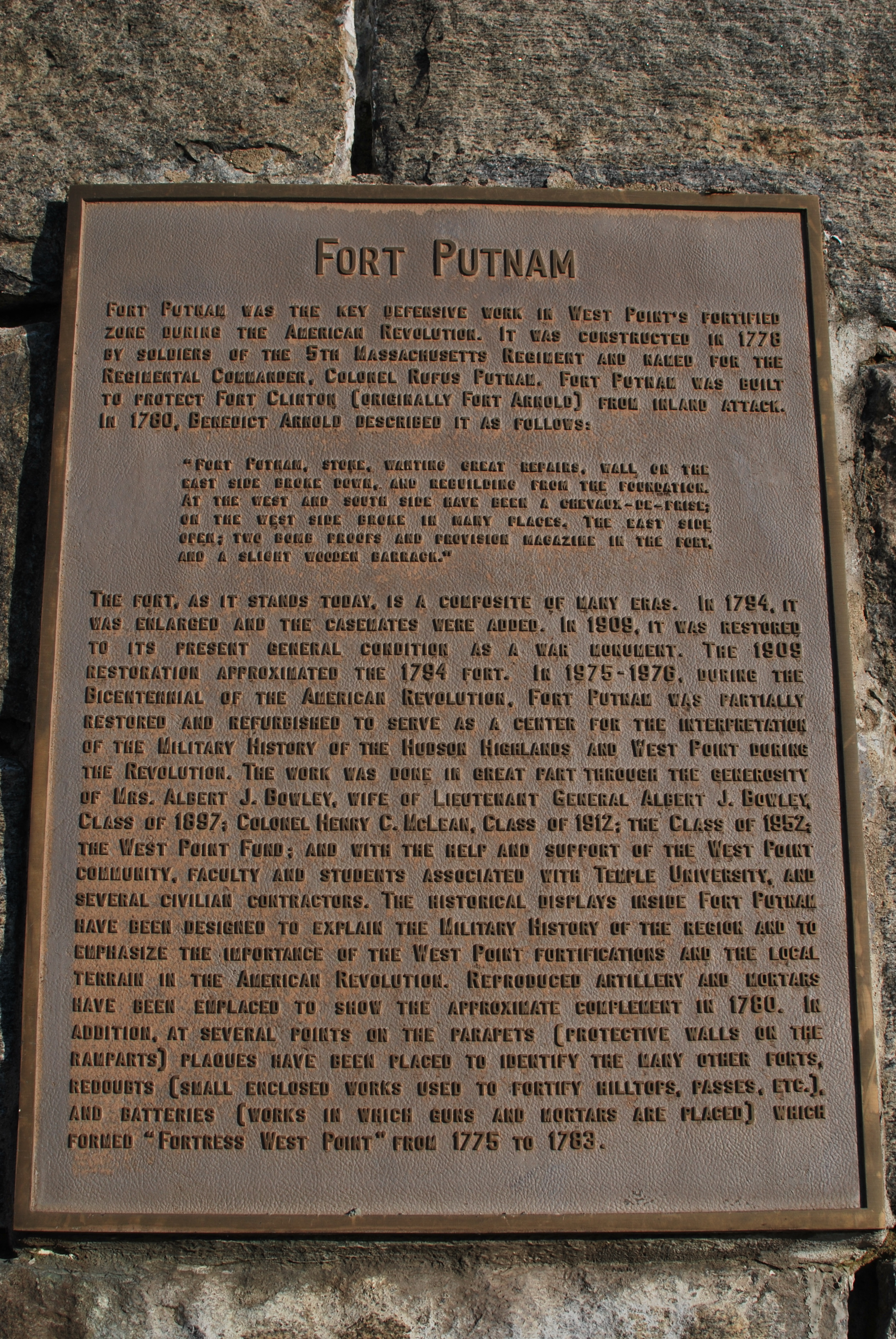
Information plate near the entrance

== See also ==
- Redoubt Four (West Point)
- Kosciuszko's Garden
