= Kosciuszko's Garden =

Park in New York, United States of America

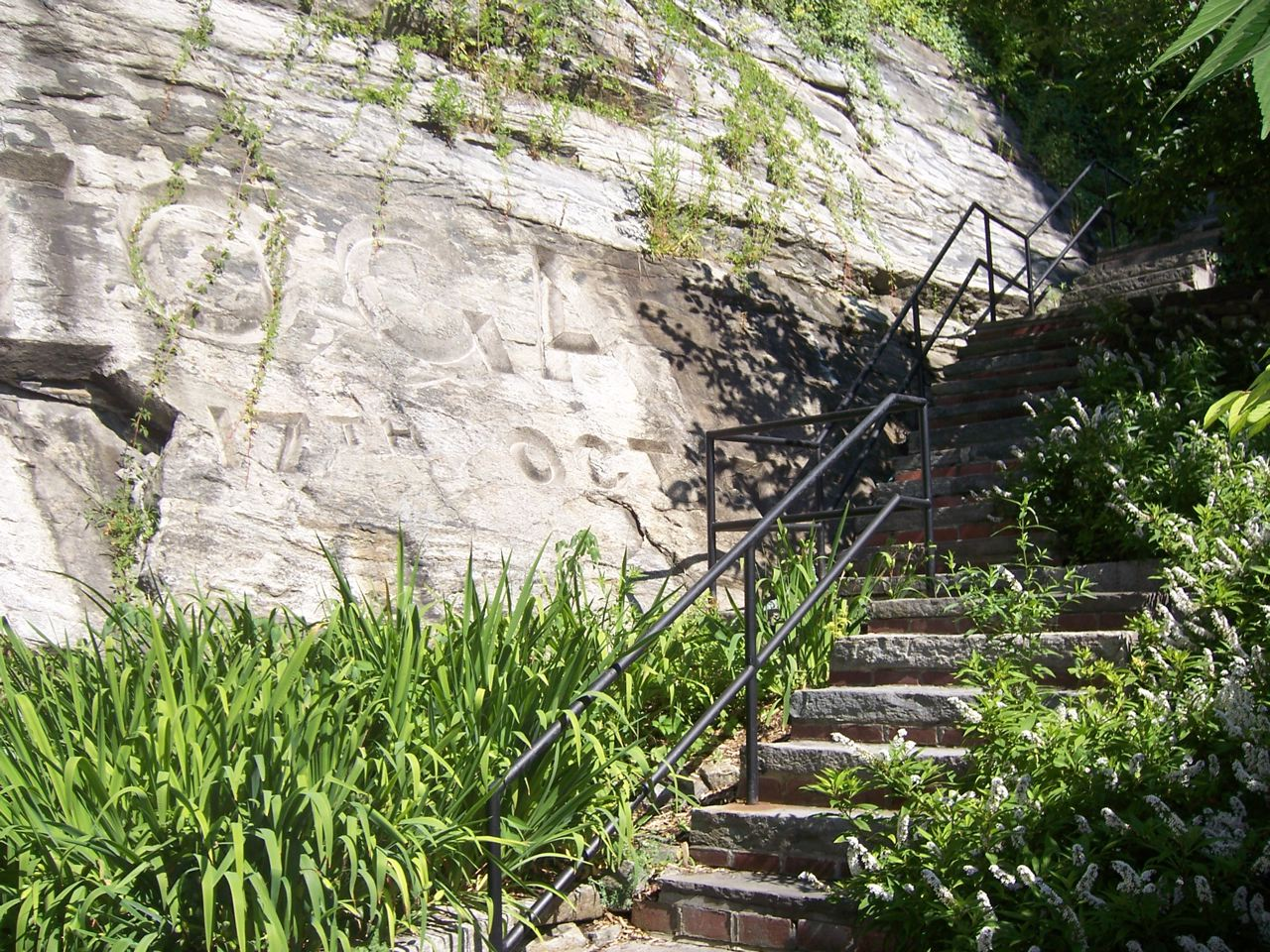
- Steps leading up from the garden, July 2008

- Location within New York
- Location: West Point, New York
- Nearest city: Highland Falls, New York
- Coordinates: 41°23′31″N 73°57′13″W
- Created: 1778
- Operator: Federal government

Kosciuszko's Garden is a small retreat garden built by Tadeusz Kosciuszko on the side of a cliff overlooking the Hudson River at West Point, New York. First constructed in 1778, it still offers visitors and cadets a place of quiet tranquility during the warmer months. The "General Edward L. Rowny Family Endowment" was established to further sustain perpetual care and maintenance of the Garden and to dedicate a plaque commemorating the occasion.

Dr. James Thacher described it in his diary, "Colonel Thaddeus Kosciuszko, a gentleman of distinction from Poland...amused himself while stationed on the point, in laying out a curious garden in a deep valley, abounding more in rocks than soil. I was gratified in viewing his curious water fountain with jets and cascades."

== See also ==
- Fort Clinton (West Point)
- Constitution Island
- Fort Putnam
- Redoubt Four (West Point)
