= Constitution Island =

Island in the Hudson River, New York

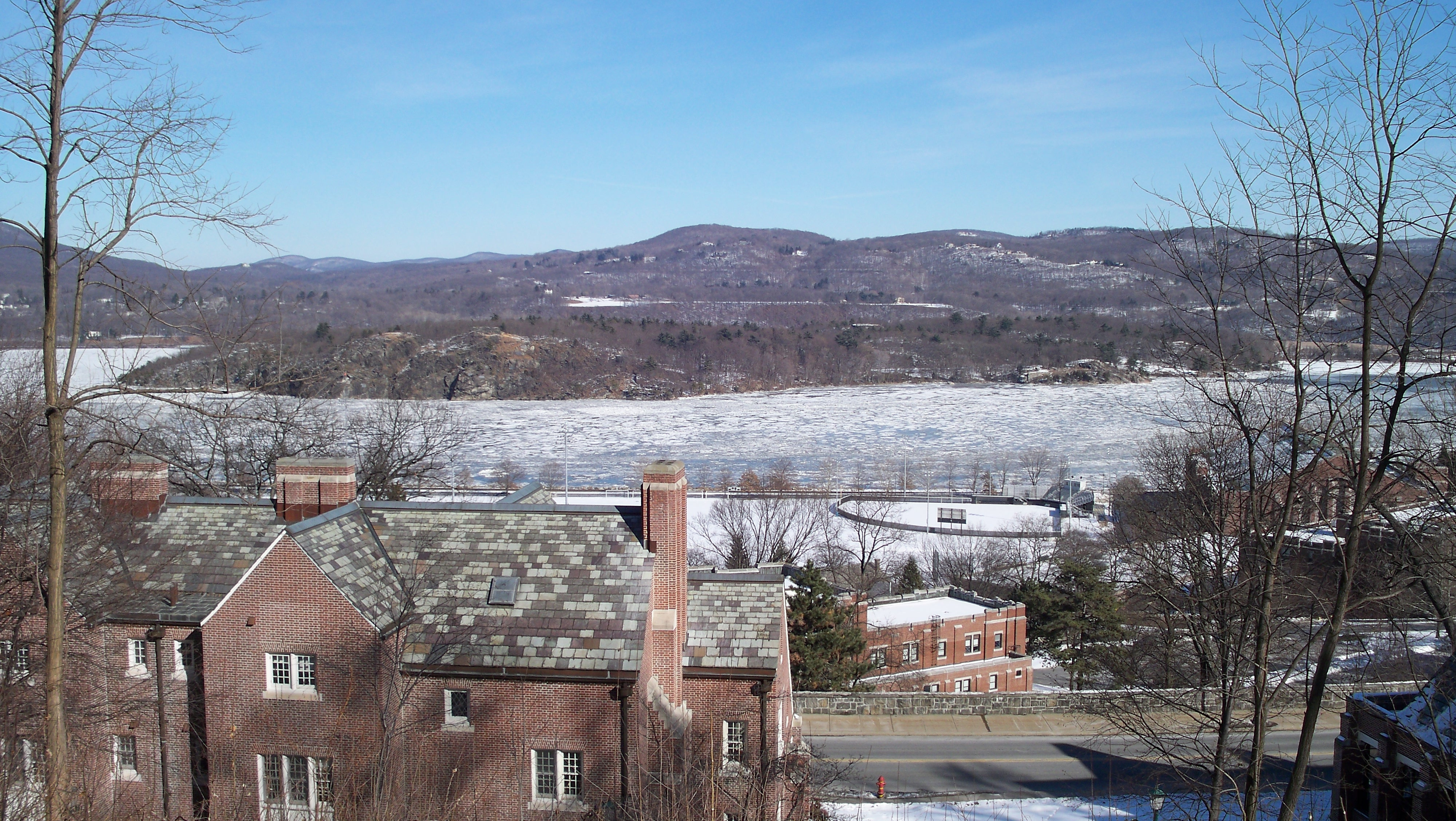
- Constitution Island from the west at Merritt Road at West Point

- Location within the United States Location within New York
- Nearest city: West Point, New York, U.S.
- Coordinates: 41°24′20″N 73°57′15″W

Constitution Island is on the east side of the Hudson River in the U.S. state of New York, north of New York City. It is directly opposite the U.S. Military Academy Reservation at West Point and is connected to the east shore by Constitution Marsh.

It is the only part of the U.S. Military Academy Reservation on the east side of the Hudson River. Formerly known as "Martelaer's Rock", Constitution Island is the site of the earliest Revolutionary War fortifications in the Hudson Valley. Taken briefly by the British in 1777, the island was re-occupied by American forces in 1778, and made an integral part of Fortress West Point. The island was bequeathed to the military academy in 1909 and has been administered by the West Point Museum ever since.

The Education Center was completed in 2016, the Warner House has been completely restored and will be ready as a museum again in the spring of 2020.

== Martelaer's Rock ==
Between Cold Spring and West Point lay a large rocky island connected to the eastern shore by a reedy marsh. Dutch Navigators called it Martelaer's Island and the part of the river between it and Storm King Mountain, Martelaer's Rack, or Martyr's Reach. The word "martyr" signified "struggling", as vessels coming up the river with a fair wind would frequently find themselves, immediately after passing the point of the island into the reach, contending with the wind ahead.

== Fort Constitution ==
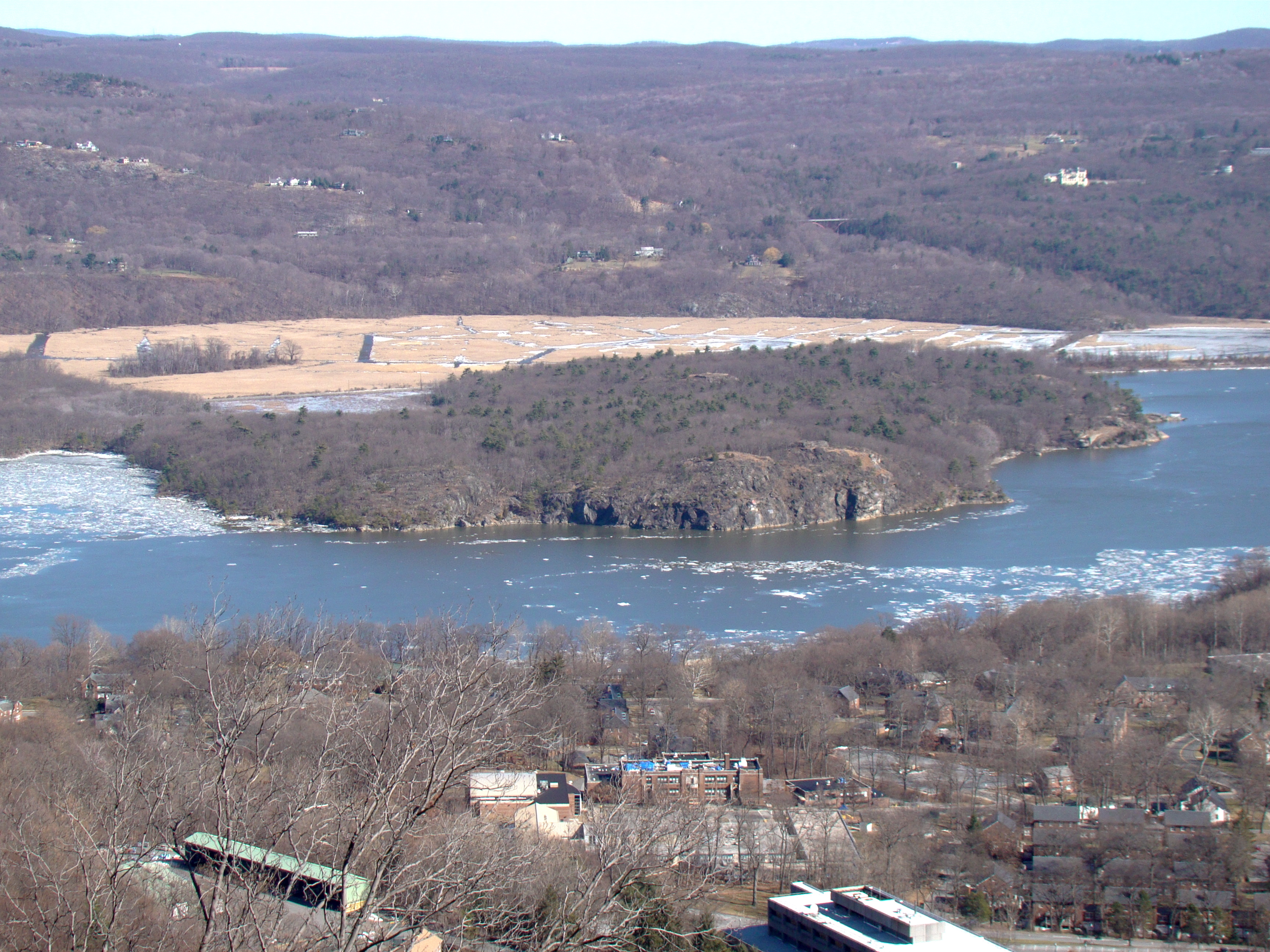
Constitution Island seen from US Route 9W

The strategic importance of the ability to control navigation along the Hudson River was obvious to both the Americans and the British from the outbreak of open hostilities. The Hudson was the major means for transportation of supplies and troops throughout a large portion of the northeast. On May 25, 1775, the Continental Congress resolved to build fortifications in the Hudson highlands for the purpose of protecting and maintaining control of the Hudson River.

General George Washington was appointed by the Continental Congress to work with the New York Provincial Congress to draft plans as to how the Hudson River should be fortified against the British. Local residents James Clinton and Christopher Tappan were sent to scout appropriate locations. The initial site chosen was Martlaer's Island, across from West Point. Located on a strategic curve in the Hudson River, engineer Bernard Romans, was appointed to begin the construction of a large fort on the island which was to be named “Fort Constitution".

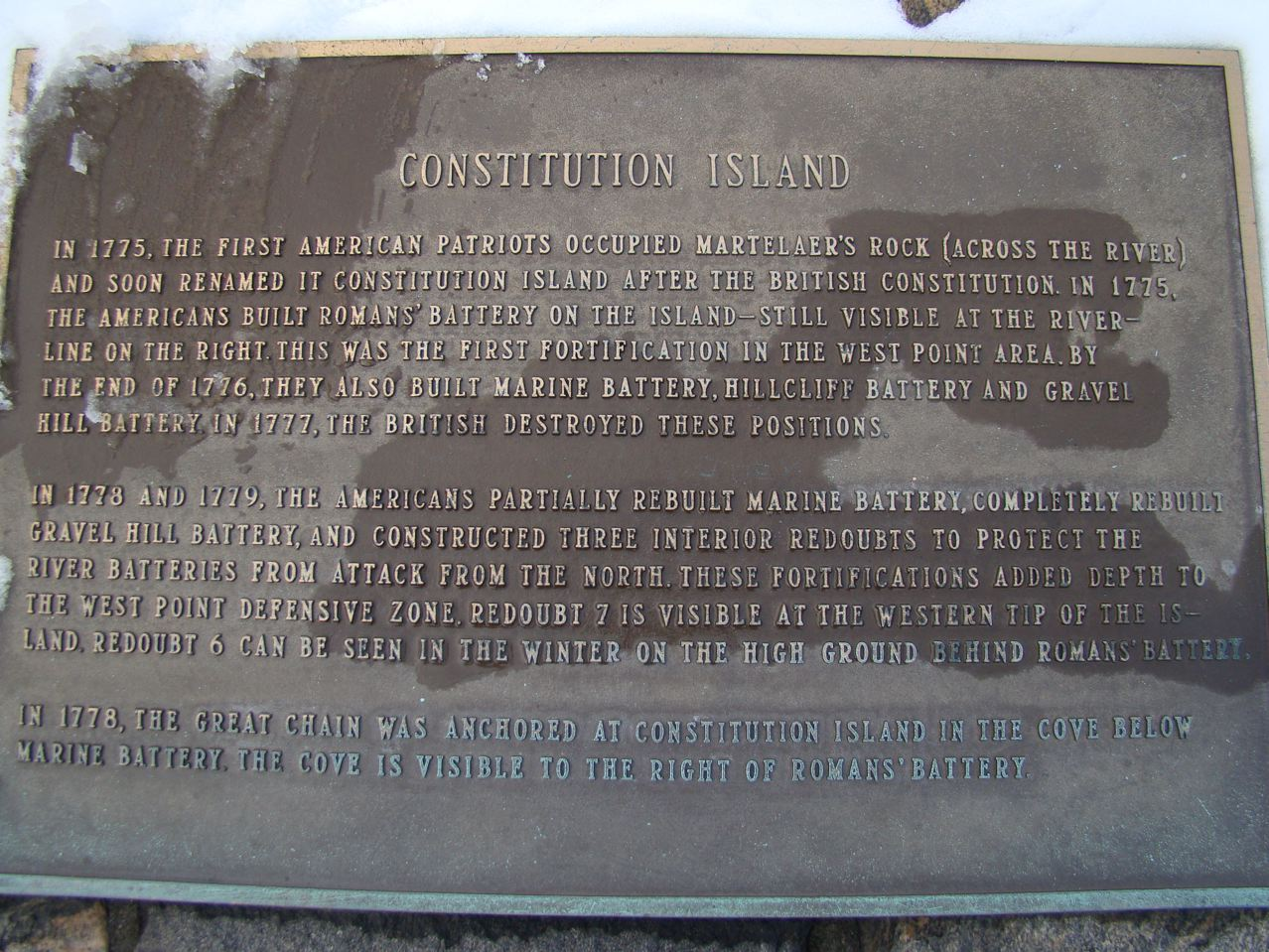
Historical marker across the river at West Point

Plans for the fort called for four bastions. Construction of the fortifications began in the summer of 1775, and the island was soon known as Constitution Island. By November it had 70 cannons. However, difficulties in construction and management of the original plan of fortifications, together with escalating costs, led to abandonment of that project. A site at Popolopen Creek across from Anthony's Nose was proposed, and in January 1776, the materials and resources from Fort Constitution were redirected to the construction at the new site. The building of Fort Constitution was suspended while the militia concentrated their efforts on building Forts Clinton, Montgomery and Independence south of the island in the hope of containing the British further downstream. The earthworks at Fort Constitution were unfinished when British troops destroyed them in 1777.

In 1778 Polish engineer Thaddeus Kosciusko began designing Fortress West Point as a series of forts and redoubts on both sides of the river. On Constitution Island, a barracks, three redoubts, and a water battery were constructed.

== Chain ==
The island is perhaps best known as the eastern anchor-point for the Great Chain, a massive iron structure that stretched across the narrow bend in the Hudson between the island and the mainland at West Point. The chain was intended to prevent British naval vessels from navigating freely along the Hudson. This was the second attempt to string a chain across the Hudson River in an effort to prevent the British from taking control of the Hudson thereby splitting the American colonies. The first chain, which weighed 35 tons and was 1650 yards long stretched between the base of Fort Montgomery and the rock at Anthony's Nose. That chain failed to stop the British forces when they attacked Forts Montgomery and Clinton. That chain was dismantled by the British.

The Great Chain remained in place (except during months when ice blocked the river) from 1778 to 1782. After the war, Constitution Island returned to civilian use.

Tadeusz Kościuszko along with Thomas Machin designed a capstan for reeling in the chain. Kosciuszko also added the Lanthorn Battery at Gee's Point and the Knox Battery to cover the South Dock. The original iron chain, with one and a half inch thick links, was replaced in 1778 with links two and a quarter inches thick, which were two feet long and weighed 140 pounds. Made by Peter Townsend's Stirling Iron Works in Warwick, New York, the 1500 foot long chain weighed 186 tons. Kept afloat on huge logs, forty men removed the chain in winter.

== Warner House ==
The Warner House as part of the National Historic Landmark of the United States Military Academy, is located on Constitution Island and administered by the West Point Museum, United States Military Academy. The Warner family owned the island and lived in the house from 1838 to 1915. Sisters Susan Bogert Warner and Anna Bartlett Warner were popular, prolific novelists whose works sold millions of copies in the United States, England and elsewhere. The Warner sisters are recognized as among the most significant American women writers of the nineteenth century. Anna Bartlett Warner's most well known song is Jesus Loves Me. In 1908, seven years before her death, Anna Warner sold the island to Mrs. Olivia Sage, widow of the financier Russell Sage.

In 1908, Mrs. Russell Sage and Miss Anna Warner presented Constitution Island to the United States government as a joint gift according to the following stipulations:

“Lawrence, L.I., September 4, 1908,

The President:

Sir: I take pleasure in tendering as a gift to the United States from myself and Miss Anna Bartlett Warner, Constitution Island, opposite of West Point…to be an addition to the Military Academy…under the following conditions: First: That ‘the Island be for the use forever of the United States Military Academy at West Point…that no part of it shall ever be used as a public picnic, excursion, or amusement ground, operated by private enterprise, individual or corporate, for profit…”

The president sent the following letter to Mrs. Sage.

“My dear Mrs. Sage:

I have received your letter of September 4th. I wish to thank you for your very generous gift to the Nation, and I have written to Miss Warner thanking her…. Permit me now, on behalf of the Nation, to thank you most heartily again for a really patriotic act.

With regard, Yours sincerely, Theodore Roosevelt.”

Both sisters are buried at West Point Cemetery.

The Constitution Island Association, a not-for-profit organization, traditionally provides historic and cultural tours for visitors to the island and maintains the extensive gardens surrounding the Warner House. At this time, the Warner House has been closed to visitors because the structure has become unsafe. The garden and grounds are open for visiting on certain days in the summer. The Military Academy has made improvements to the site including upgrades to the roadways, drainage, support facilities and trails. The West Point Museum and United States Army Garrison have begun the construction of an Education Center on the island. The project is a joint effort of the US Army Corps of Engineers, Directorate of Public Works, West Point and the West Point Museum and solely funded by the United States Army Garrison, West Point.

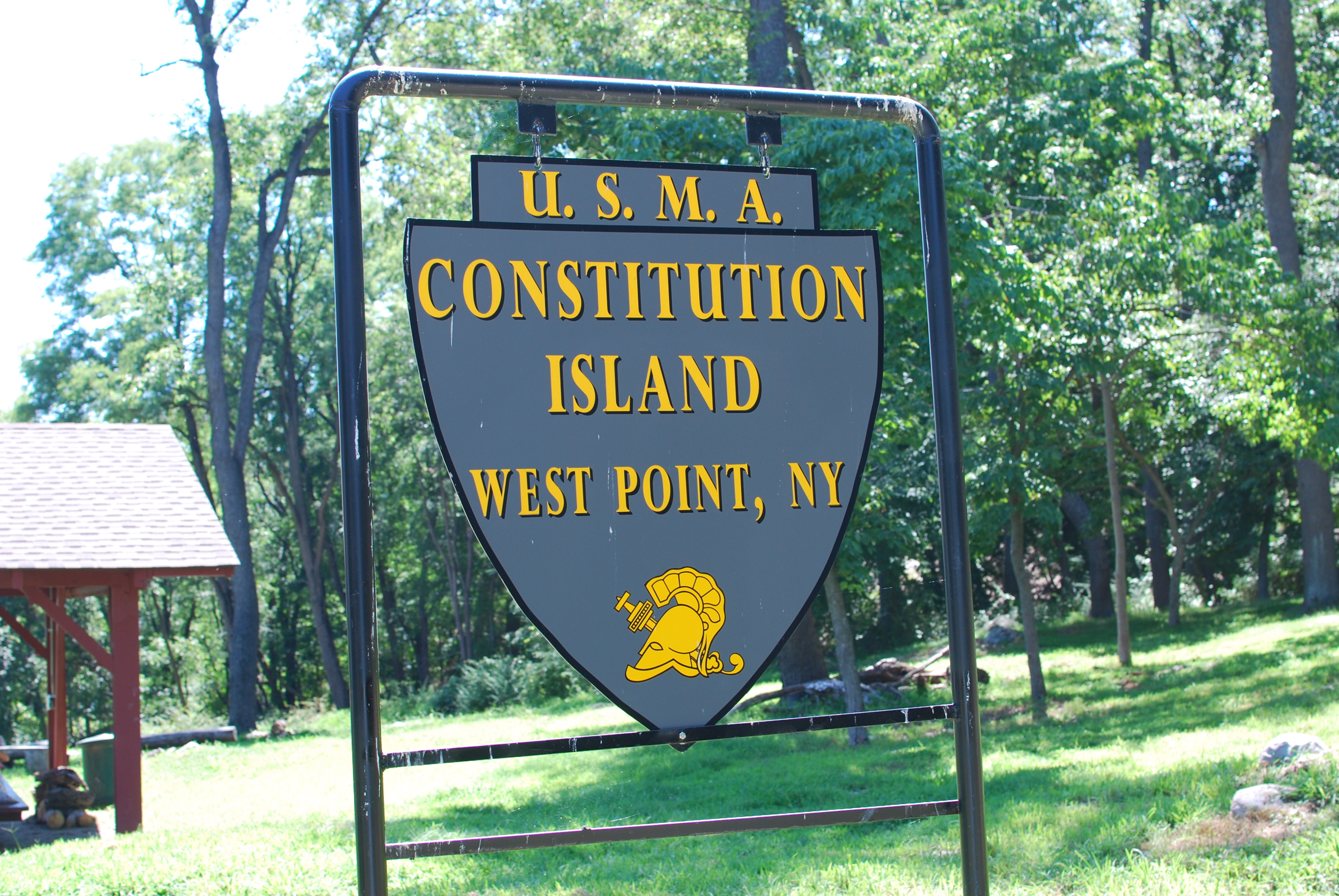
Sign near caretaker's cottage

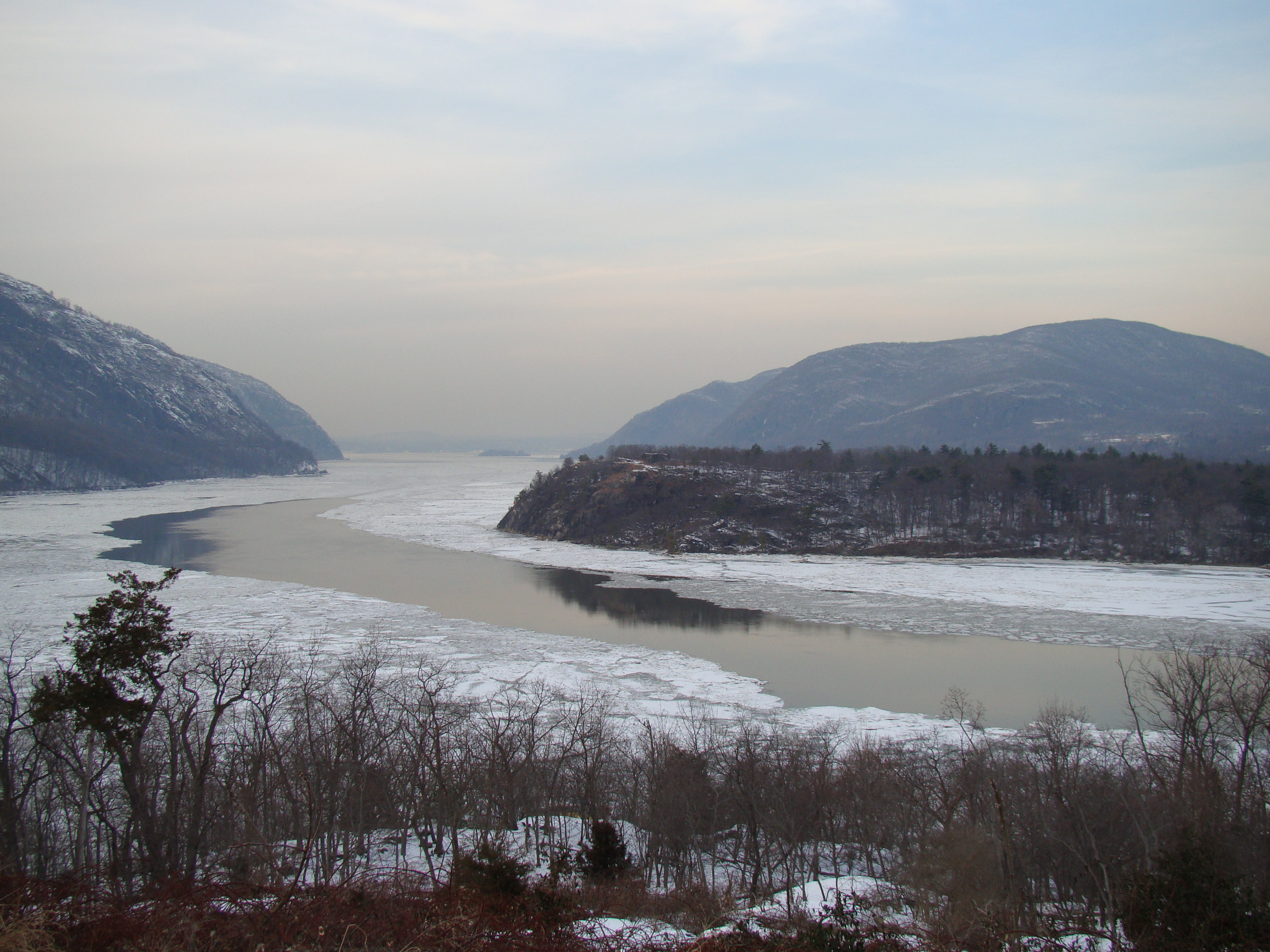
Viewed from Trophy Point during Winter

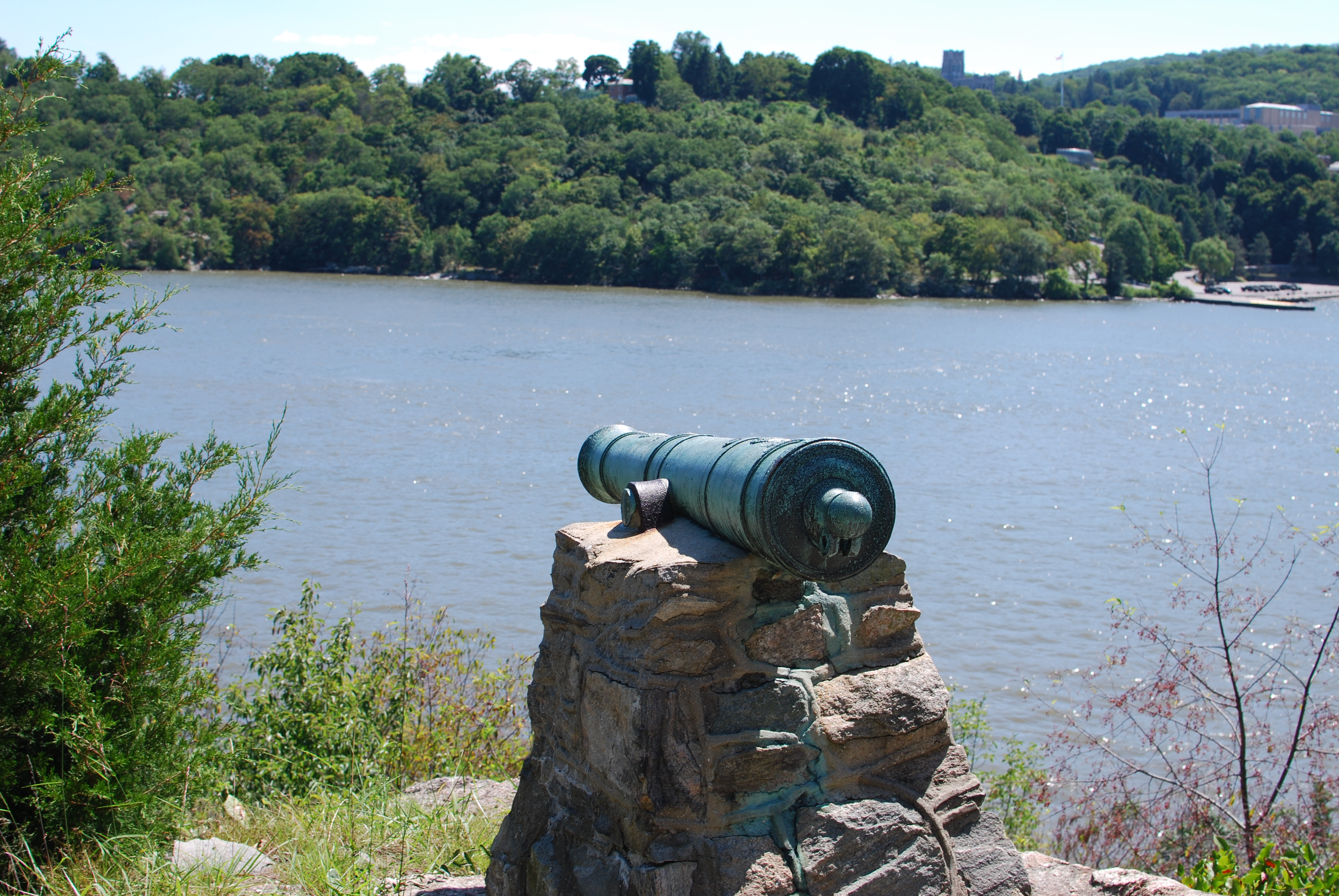
Cannon on site of original Ft. Constitution

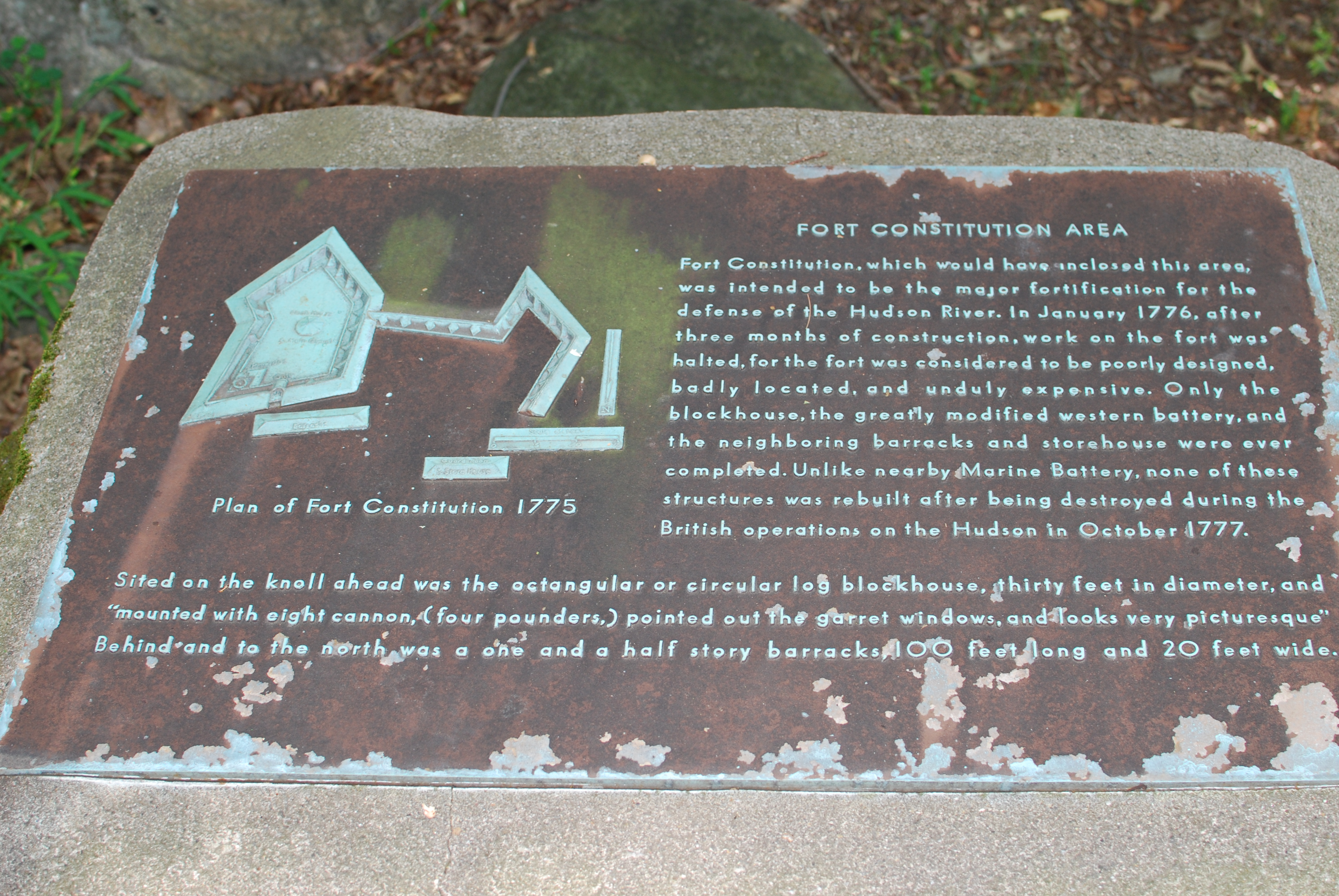
Ft. Constitution information plaque

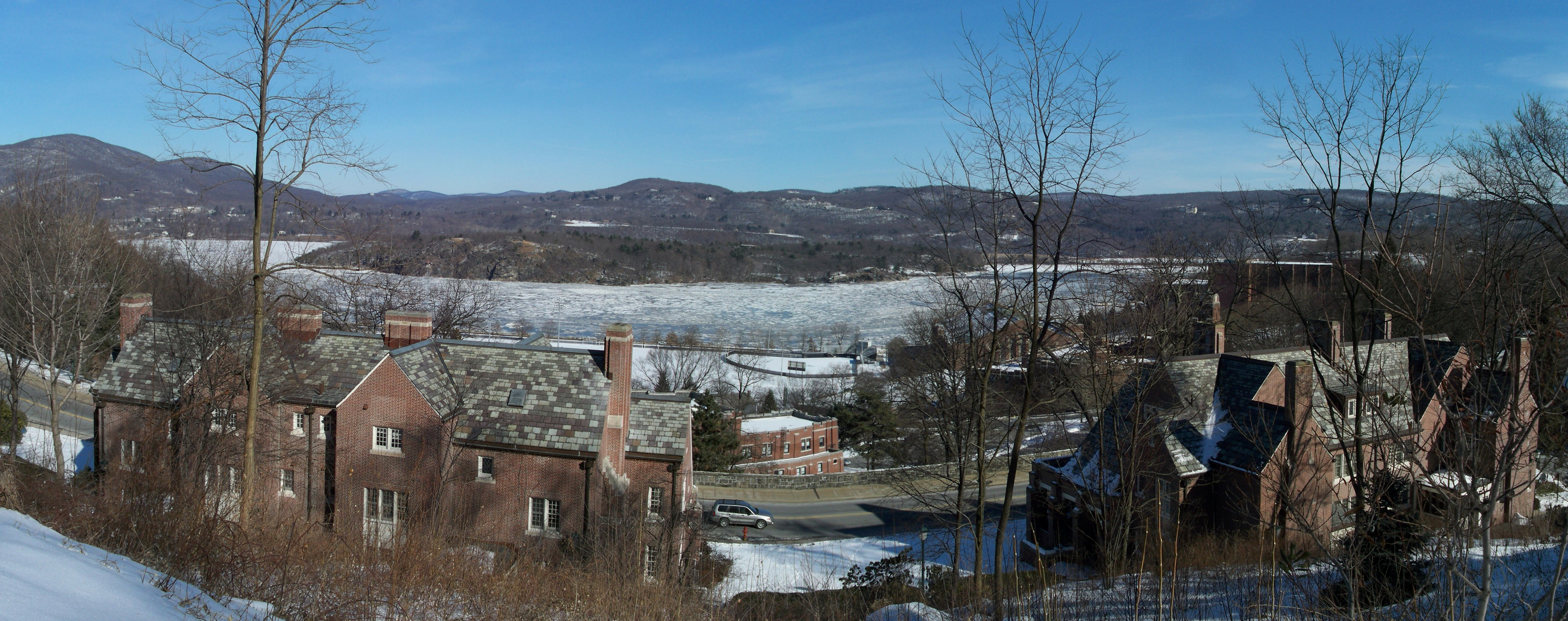
Panoramic view of the island looking east

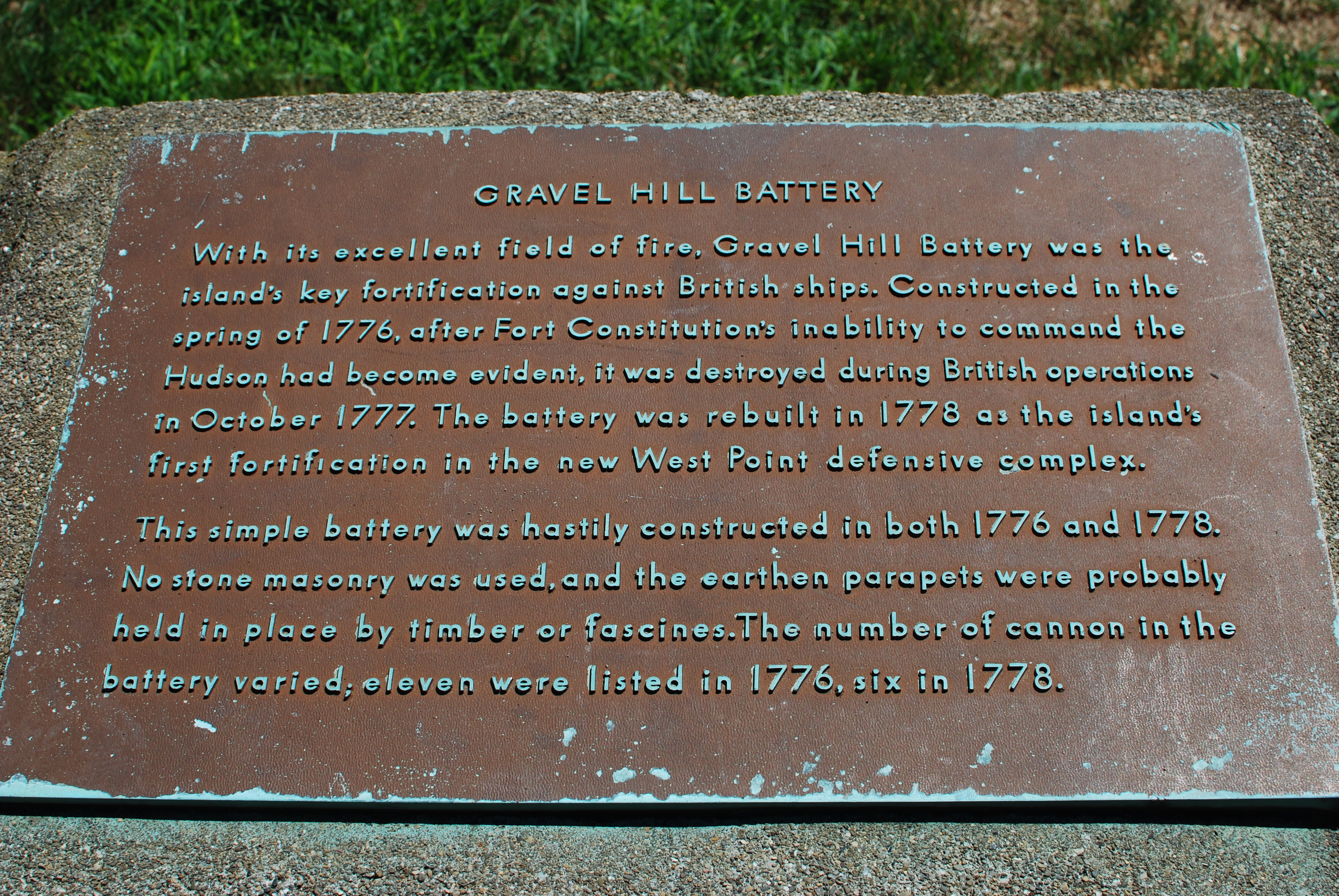
Gravel Hill Battery plaque

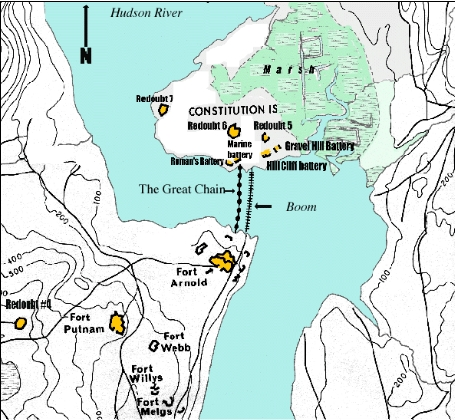
Map of West Point fortifications from 1775 to 1783 showing the island and vicinity

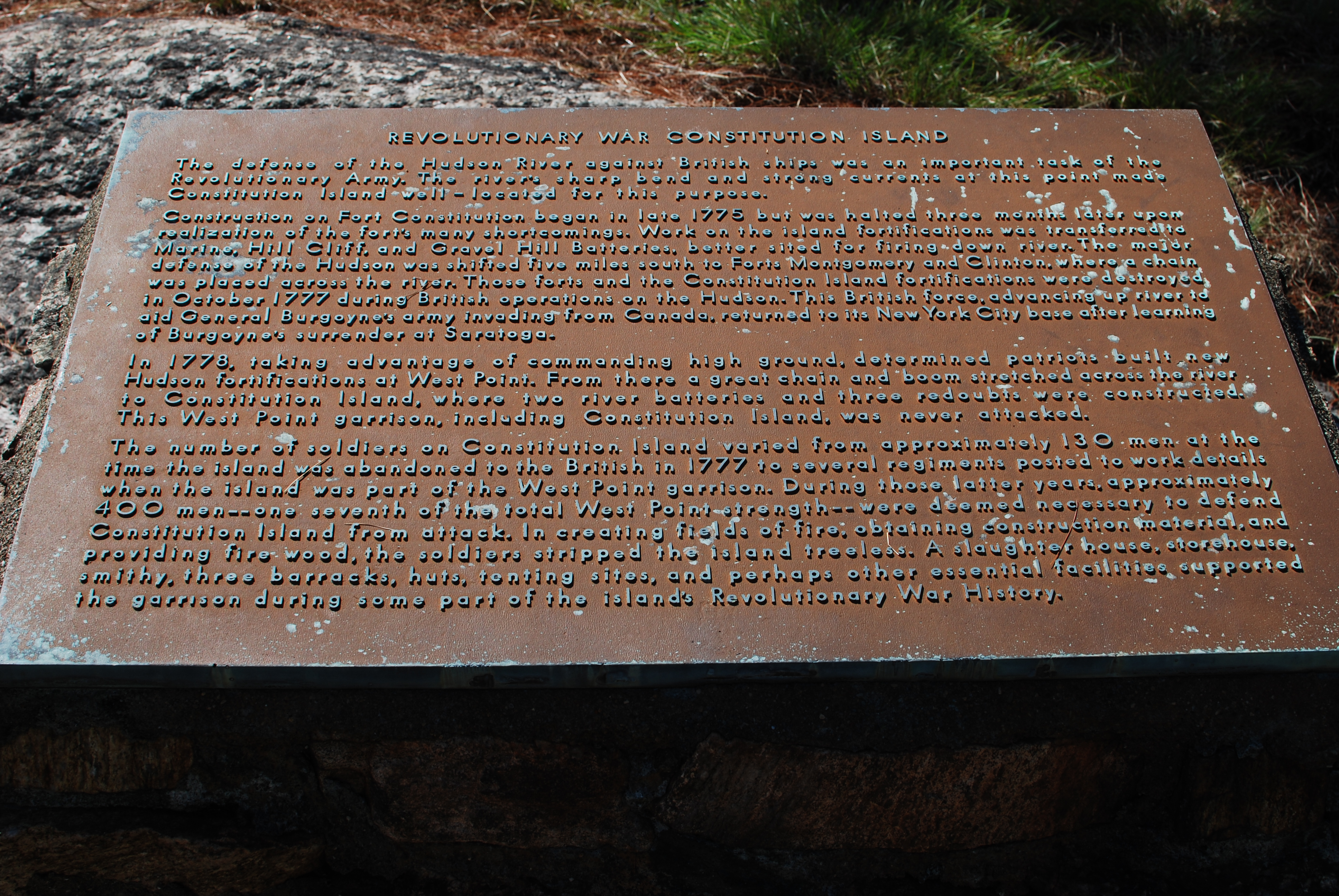
Information plaque at boat dock

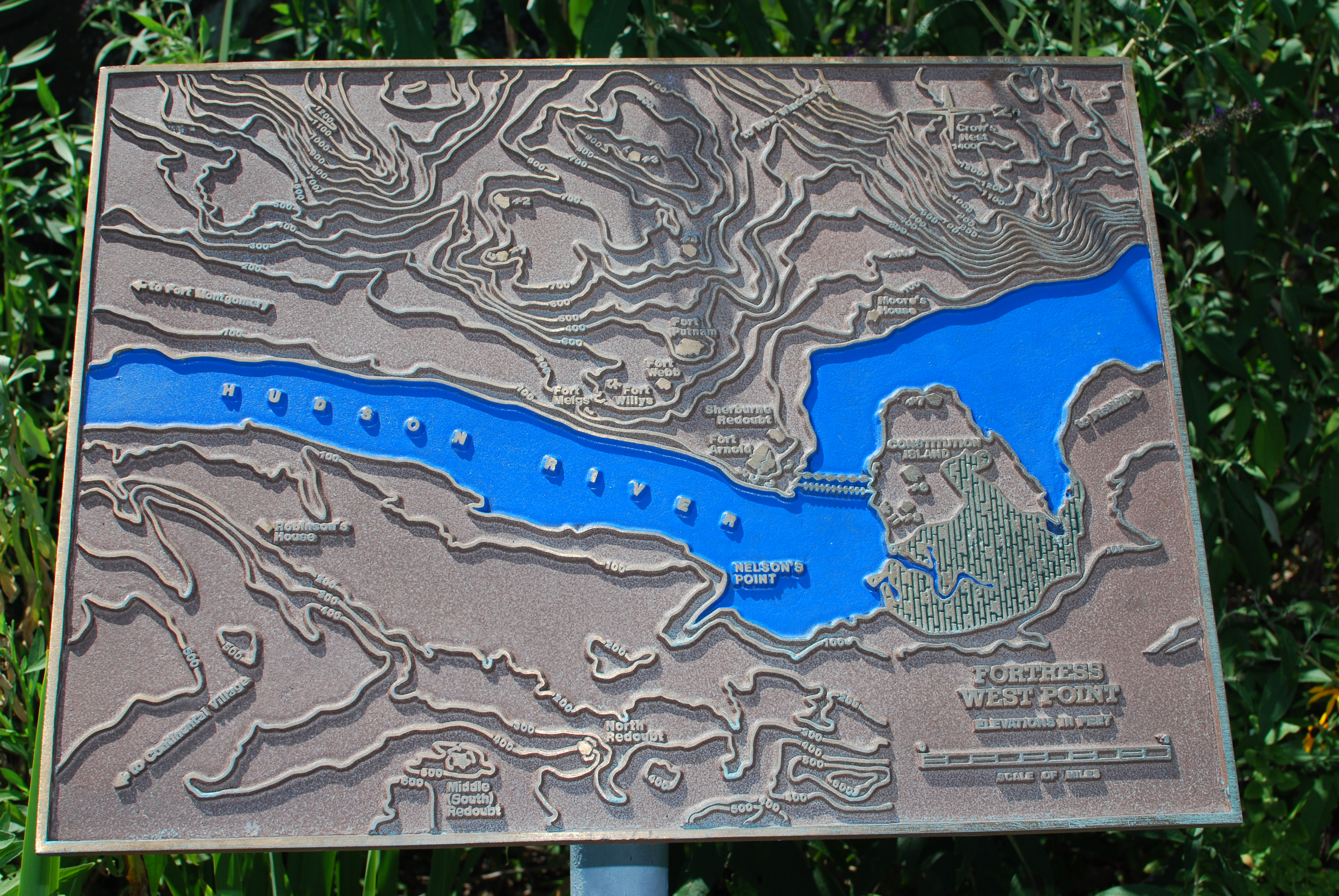
Fortress West Point info plaque at boat dock

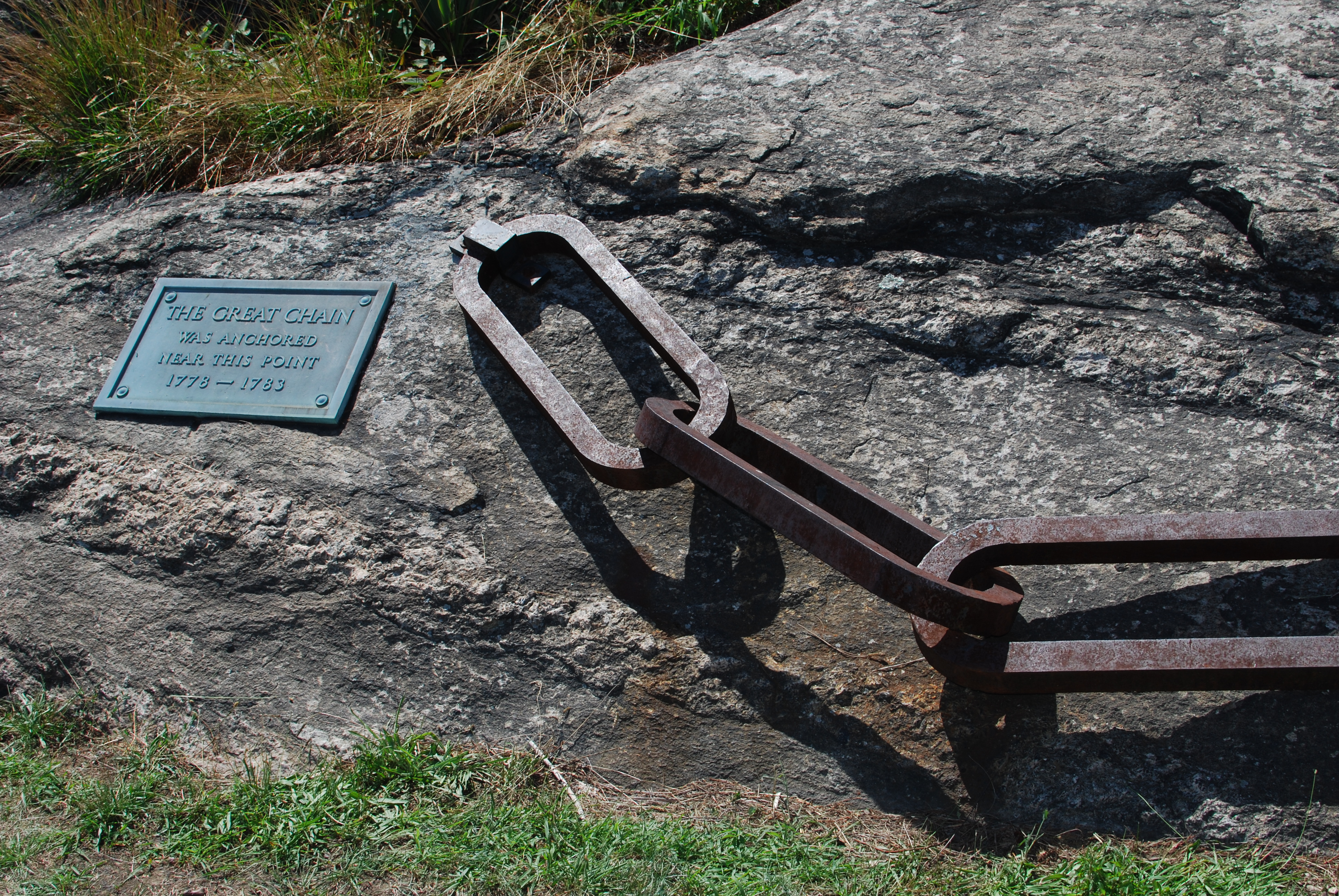
Great Chain historical marker at the boat dock

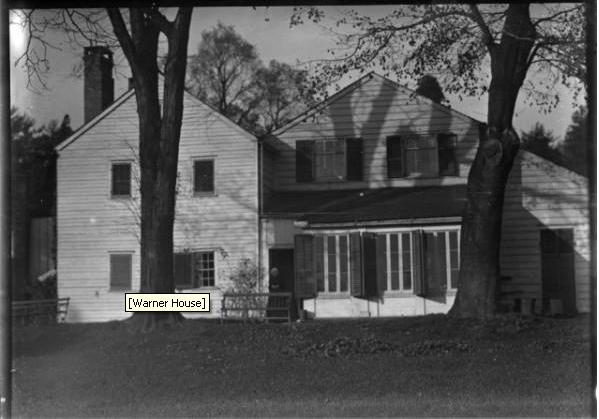
The Warner house c1908

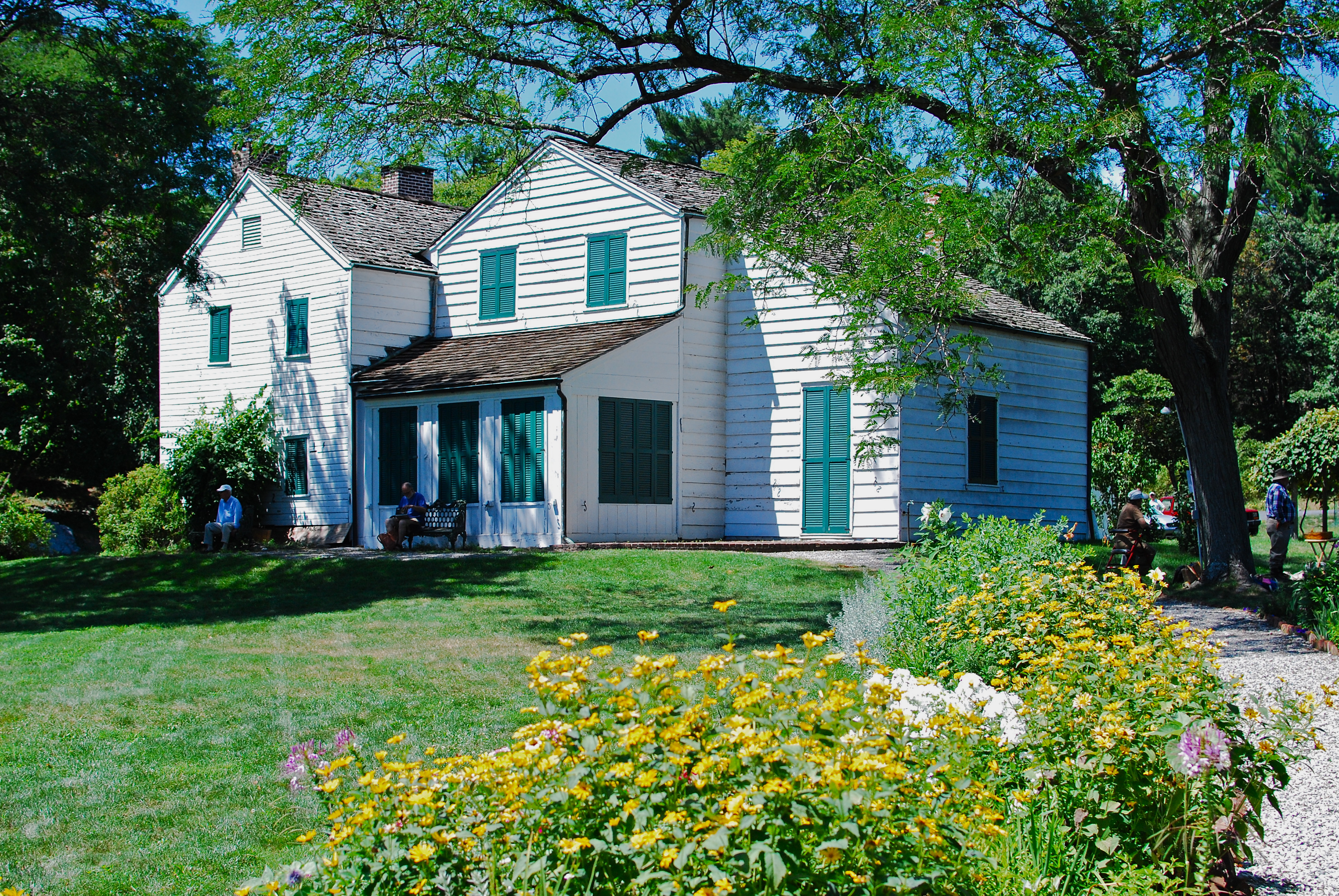
Warner House, July 2010

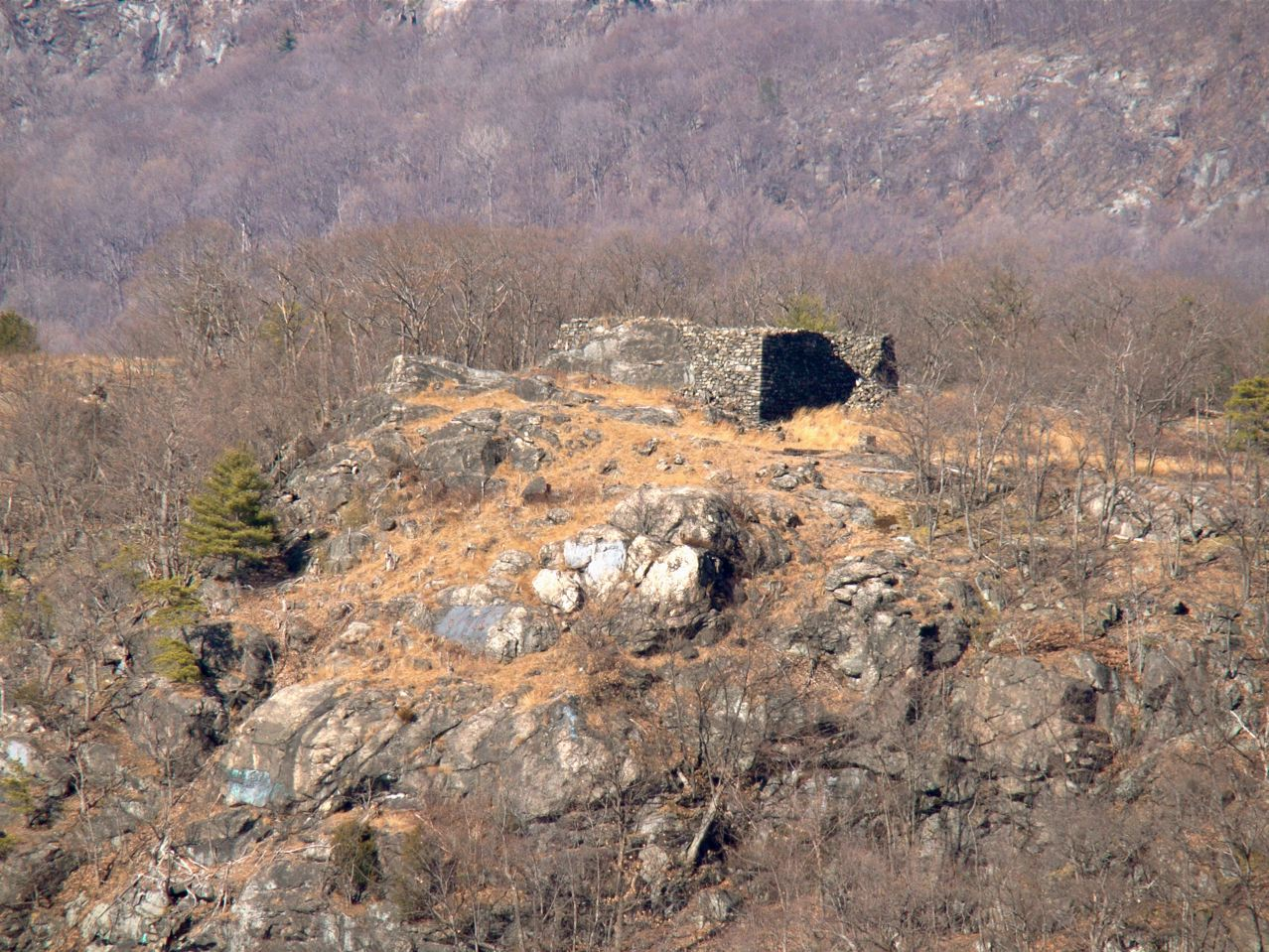
Redoubt 7 on western edge of island, as seen from Trophy Point

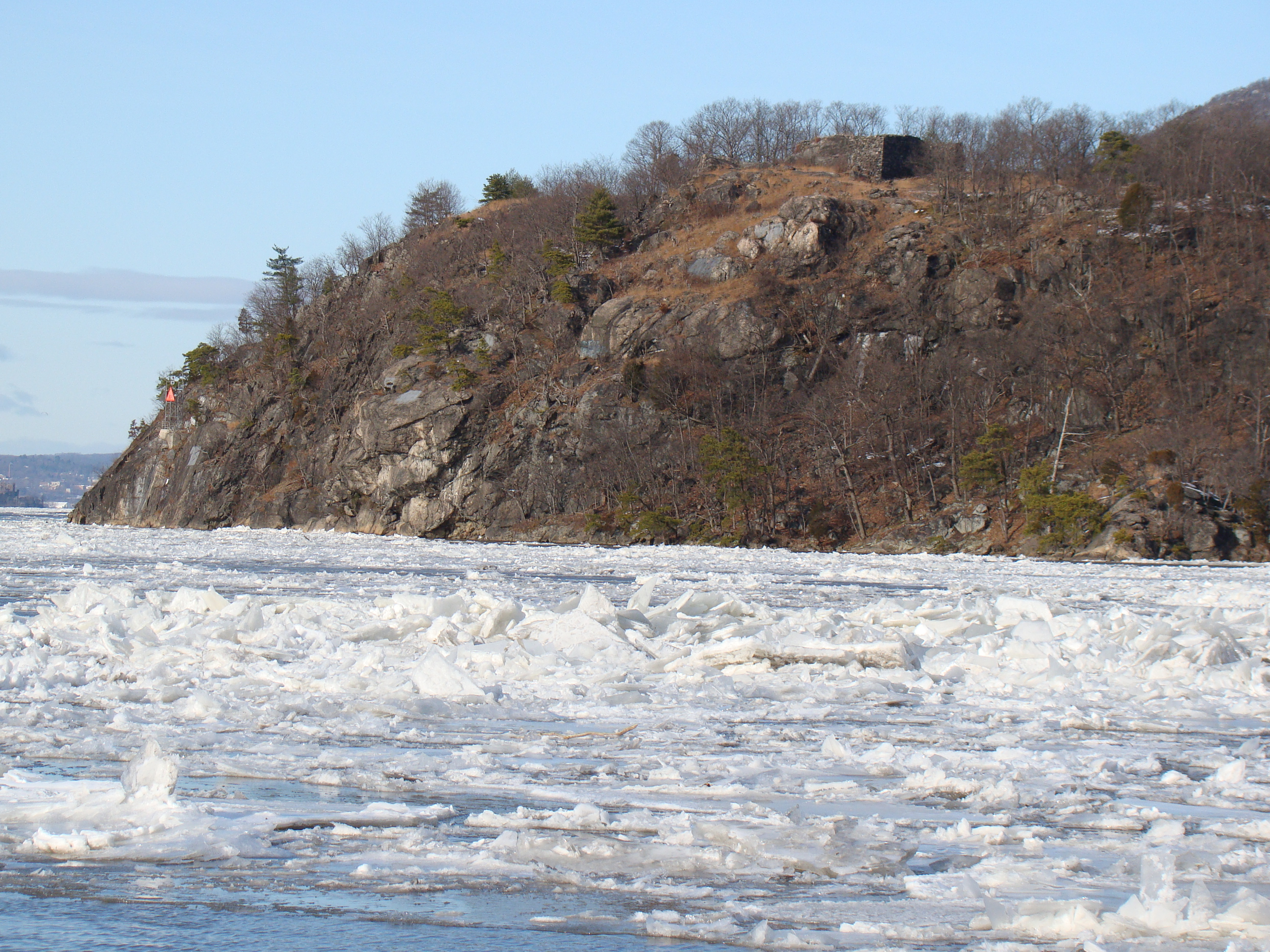
Ruins of Redoubt #7 on the western bluff of the island

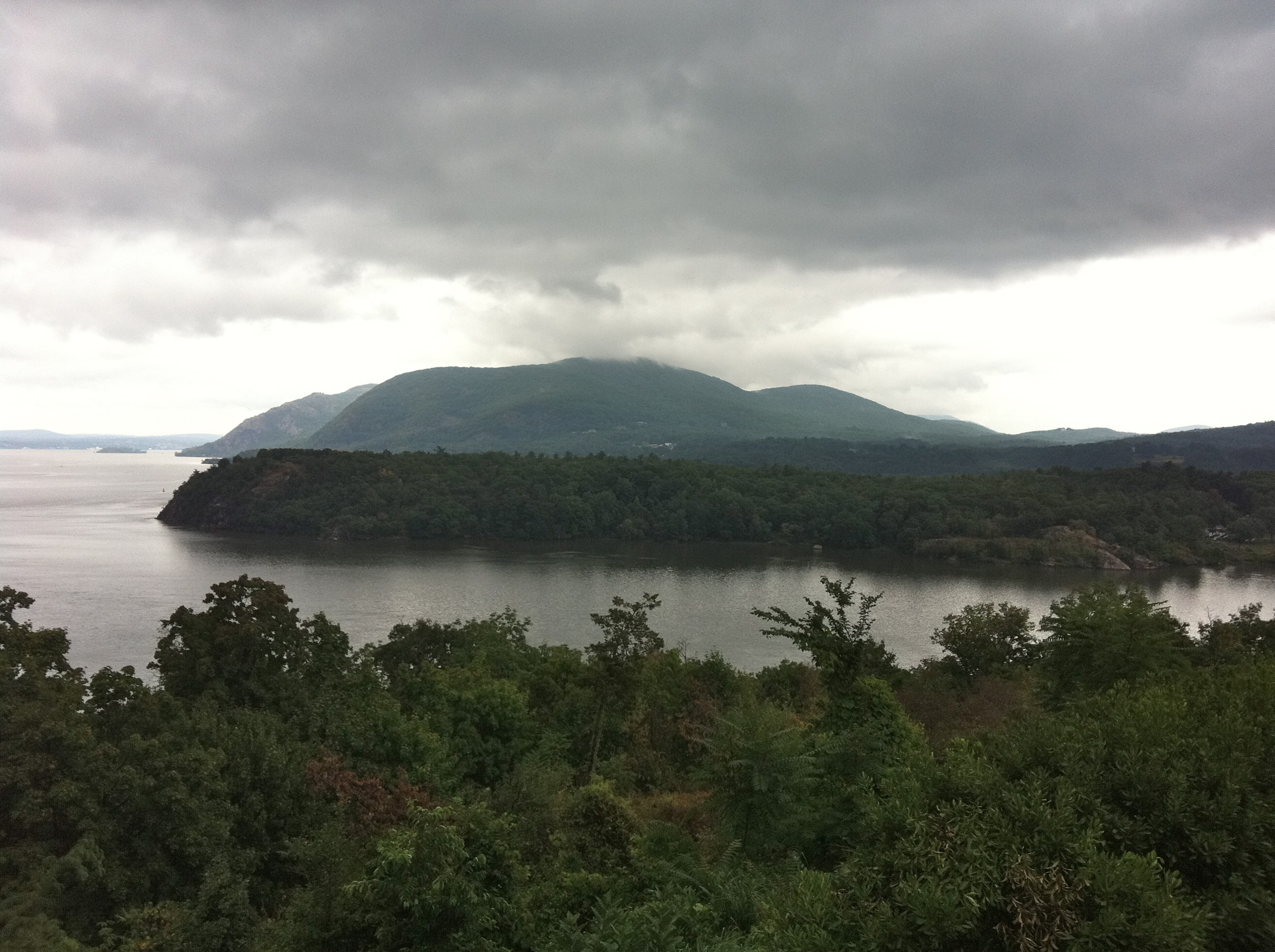
View from Sherburne Battery at West Point

== See also ==
- Fort Putnam
- Fort Clinton (West Point)
- Redoubt Four (West Point)
- Kosciuszko's Garden
