= History of the Hudson Valley =

The Hudson Valley (also known as the Hudson River Valley) comprises the valley of the Hudson River and its adjacent communities in the U.S. state of New York, from the cities of Albany and Troy southward to Yonkers in Westchester County. Depending upon the definition delineating its boundaries, the Hudson Valley encompasses a growing metropolis that is home to between 3 and 3.5 million residents centered along the north–south axis of the Hudson River.

== Pre-Columbian era ==
The Hudson Valley was inhabited by indigenous peoples ages before Europeans arrived. The Algonquins lived along the Hudson River, with the three subdivisions of that group being the Lenape (also known as the Delaware Indians), the Wappingers, and the Mahicans. The lower Hudson River was inhabited by the Lenape Indians. In fact, the Lenape Indians were the people that waited for the explorer Giovanni da Verrazzano onshore, traded with Henry Hudson, and sold the island of Manhattan. Further north, the Wappingers lived from Manhattan Island up to Poughkeepsie. They lived a similar lifestyle to the Lenape, residing in various villages along the river. They traded with both the Lenape to the south and the Mahicans to the north. The Mahicans lived in the northern valley from present-day Kingston to Lake Champlain, with their capital located near present-day Albany.

The Lenape, the Wappingers, and the Mahicans were speakers of languages that were part of Algonquin language family. As such, the three subdivisions were able to communicate with each other. Their relations with each other were mostly peaceful. However, the Mahicans were often in direct conflict with the Mohawk Indians to the west, which was a part of the Iroquois nation. The Mohawks would sometimes raid Mahican villages from the west.

The Algonquins in the region lived mainly in small clans and villages throughout the area. One major fortress was called Navish, which was located at Croton Point, overlooking the Hudson River. Other fortresses were located in various locations throughout the Hudson Highlands. Villagers lived in various types of houses, which the Algonquins called Wigwams. The houses could be circular or rectangular. Large families often lived in longhouses that could be a hundred feet long. At the associated villages, the indigenous peoples grew corn, beans, and squash. They also scavenged for other types of plant foods, such as various types of nuts and berries. In addition to agriculture, they also fished for food in the river, focusing on various species of freshwater fish, as well as several variations of striped bass, sturgeon, herring, and shad. Oyster beds were also common on the river floor, which provided an extra source of nutrition. Land hunting consisted of turkey, deer, rabbits, and other animals.

== Exploration, colonization, and revolution: 1497 to 1800 ==
=== Exploration of the Hudson River ===
In 1497, John Cabot traveled along the coast and claimed the entire country for England; he is credited with the Old World's discovery of continental North America. In 1524, Florentine explorer Giovanni da Verrazzano visited the bay of New York, in service of Francis I of France. On his voyage, Verrazzano sailed north along the Atlantic seaboard, starting in the Carolinas. Verrazzano sailed all the way to New York Harbor, which he thought was the mouth of a major river. Verrazzano sailed his boat into the harbor and possibly sailed over what is now Battery Park (Battery Park was created with landfill). However, Verrazzano never sailed up the Hudson River and left the harbor shortly thereafter. A year later, Estevan Gomez, a Portuguese explorer sailing for Spain in search of the Northwest Passage visited New York Bay. The extent of his explorations in the bay is unknown. Yet as Charles H. Winfield has noted, as late as 1679, there was a tradition among the First Nations that the Spanish arrived before the Dutch, and that from them it was that the natives obtained the maize or Spanish wheat. Maps of that era based on Gomez's map labeled the coast from New Jersey to Rhode Island, as the "land of Estevan Gomez".

In 1598 some Dutch employed by the Greenland Company wintered in the Bay. Eleven years later, the Dutch East India Company financed English navigator Henry Hudson in his attempt to search for the Northwest Passage. During this attempt, Henry Hudson decided to sail his ship up the river that would later be named after him. As he continued up the river, its width expanded, into Haverstraw Bay, leading him to believe he had successfully reached the Northwest Passage. He docked his ship on the western shore of Haverstraw Bay and claimed the territory as the first Dutch settlement in North America. He also proceeded upstream as far as present-day Troy before concluding that no such strait existed there.

=== Dutch colonization ===
After Henry Hudson realized that the Hudson River was not the Northwest Passage, the Dutch began to examine the region for potential trading opportunities. Dutch explorer and merchant Adriaen Block led a voyage up the lower Hudson River, the East River, and out into Long Island Sound. This voyage determined that the fur trade would be profitable in the region. As such, the Dutch established the colony of New Netherland.

The Dutch settled three major outposts: New Amsterdam, Wiltwyck, and Fort Orange. New Amsterdam was founded at the mouth of the Hudson River, and would later become known as New York City. Wiltwyck was founded roughly halfway up the Hudson River between New Amsterdam and Fort Orange. That outpost would later become Kingston. Fort Orange was the outpost that was the furthest up the Hudson River. That outpost would later become known as Albany.

New Netherland and its associated outposts were set up as fur-trading outposts. The Dutch attempted to form a trade alliance with the Mahicans, angering the Mohawk nation and provoking hostilities between the two tribes. The Natives began to trap furs at a quicker pace and then sold them to the Dutch for luxuries. This trade would eventually deplete the supply of those animals in their territory, which decreased the food supply. The focus on furs also made the Natives economically dependent on the Dutch for trade.

The Dutch West India Company operated a monopoly on the region for roughly twenty years before other businessmen were allowed to set up their own ventures in the colony. New Amsterdam quickly became the colony's most important city, operating as its capital and its merchant hub. The other outposts functioned as settlements in the wilderness. At first, the colony was made up of mostly single adventures looking to make money, but over time the region transitioned into maintaining family households. New economic activity in the form of food, tobacco, timber, and slave trade was eventually incorporated into the colonial economy.

In 1647, Director-General Peter Stuyvesant took over management of the colony. He found the colony in chaos due to a border war with the English along the Connecticut River, and Indian battles throughout the region. Stuyvesant quickly cracked down on smuggling and associated activity before expanding the outposts along the Hudson River, especially Wiltwyck at the mouth of Esopus Creek. Stuyvesant attempted to establish a fort midway up the Hudson River. However, before that could be done, the British invaded New Netherland via the port of New Amsterdam. Given that the city of New Amsterdam was largely defenseless, Stuyvesant was forced to surrender the city and the colony to the British. New Amsterdam and the overall colony of New Netherland was renamed New York, after the Duke of York. The Dutch regained New York temporarily, only to relinquish it again a few years later, thus ending Dutch control over New York and the Hudson River.

=== British colonization ===
Under British colonial rule, the Hudson Valley became an agricultural hub, with manors being developed on the east side of the river. At these manors, landlords rented out land to their tenants, letting them take a share of the crops grown while keeping and selling the rest of the crops. Tenants were often kept at a subsistence level so that the landlord could minimize his costs. They also held immense political power in the colony due to driving such a large proportion of the agricultural output. Meanwhile, land west of Hudson River contained smaller landholdings with many small farmers living off the land. A large crop grown in the region was grain, which was largely shipped downriver to New York City, the colony's main seaport, for export back to Great Britain. In order to export the grain, colonial merchants were given monopolies to grind the grain into flour and export it. Grain production was also at high levels in the Mohawk River Valley.

During the French and Indian War in the 1750s, the northern end of the valley became the bulwark of the British defense against French invasion from Canada via Lake Champlain.

=== Revolutionary War ===
Map of Washington's retreat through New York and New Jersey

The Hudson River was a key river during the Revolution. The Hudson River was important for a few reasons. First, the Hudson's connection to the Mohawk River allowed travelers to get to the Great Lakes and the Mississippi River eventually. In addition, the river's close proximity to Lake George and Lake Champlain would allow the British navy to control the water route from Montreal to New York City. In doing so, the British, under General John Burgoyne's strategy, would be able to cut off the patriot hub of New England (which is on the eastern side of the Hudson River) and focus on rallying the support of loyalists in the South and Mid-Atlantic regions. The British knew that total occupation of the colonies would be infeasible, which is why this strategy was chosen.

As a result of the strategy, numerous battles were fought along the river, including several in the Hudson Valley. George Washington's Continental Army had retreated north to White Plains, New York in 1776, as the British pursued him and his army. While the British advanced towards him, Washington decided to take a stand in White Plains. In October 1776, Howe's army advanced from New Rochelle, and Scarsdale. Washington set up defensive positions in the hills around the village. When the British attacked, the British managed to break the Continental's defenses at Chatterton Hill, now known as Battle Hill. Once the British managed to reach the top of the hill, Washington was forced to retreat. The main positive for Washington after this battle was that he managed to avoid being enveloped by the British Army. Washington ordered his men to retreat across the Hudson River, eventually reaching New Jersey and Pennsylvania. Because Washington was able to preserve what was left of his army, this retreat would eventually lead to the successful surprise attacks on Trenton, New Jersey and Princeton, New Jersey in December of the same year. Fort Washington in Upper Manhattan later fell after this retreat.

Once Washington retreated to Pennsylvania, New England militias had to fortify the Hudson Highlands, a choke point on the river north of Haverstraw Bay. As a result, the Continentals started building Fort Clinton on the other side of the river from Fort Montgomery. In the year 1777, Washington expected General Howe to sail his army north to Saratoga in order to meet up with General Burgoyne. This would result in the Hudson River being sealed off. However, Howe surprised Washington by sailing his army south to Philadelphia, conquering the Patriot capital. Washington was out of position and sought to defend Philadelphia, but to no avail. Meanwhile, Howe left Sir Henry Clinton in charge of a smaller force to be docked in New York City, with the permission to strike the Hudson Valley at any time. On October 5, 1777, Clinton's army did so. At the Battle of the Hudson Highlands, Clinton's force sailed up the Hudson River and attacked the twin forts. Along the way, the army looted and pillaged the village of Peeksill. The Continentals fought hard at the battle, but they were badly outnumbered and were fighting in unfinished forts. Washington's men were caught between defending Philadelphia and defending the Hudson Valley. In the end, the British took the fort, as well as taking Philadelphia around the same time. However, Clinton and his men returned to New York City soon afterward.

The Continentals later decided to build the Great West Point Chain in order to prevent another British fleet from sailing up the Hudson River in a similar manner as during the previous battle. The chain that was by the forts was simply circumvented by the British army via attacking on the shores. The new chain, designed by engineer Captain Thomas Machin, could have theoretically been lowered in order to let friendly ships sail down the river, but the chain was never tested, and was later discarded after the war.

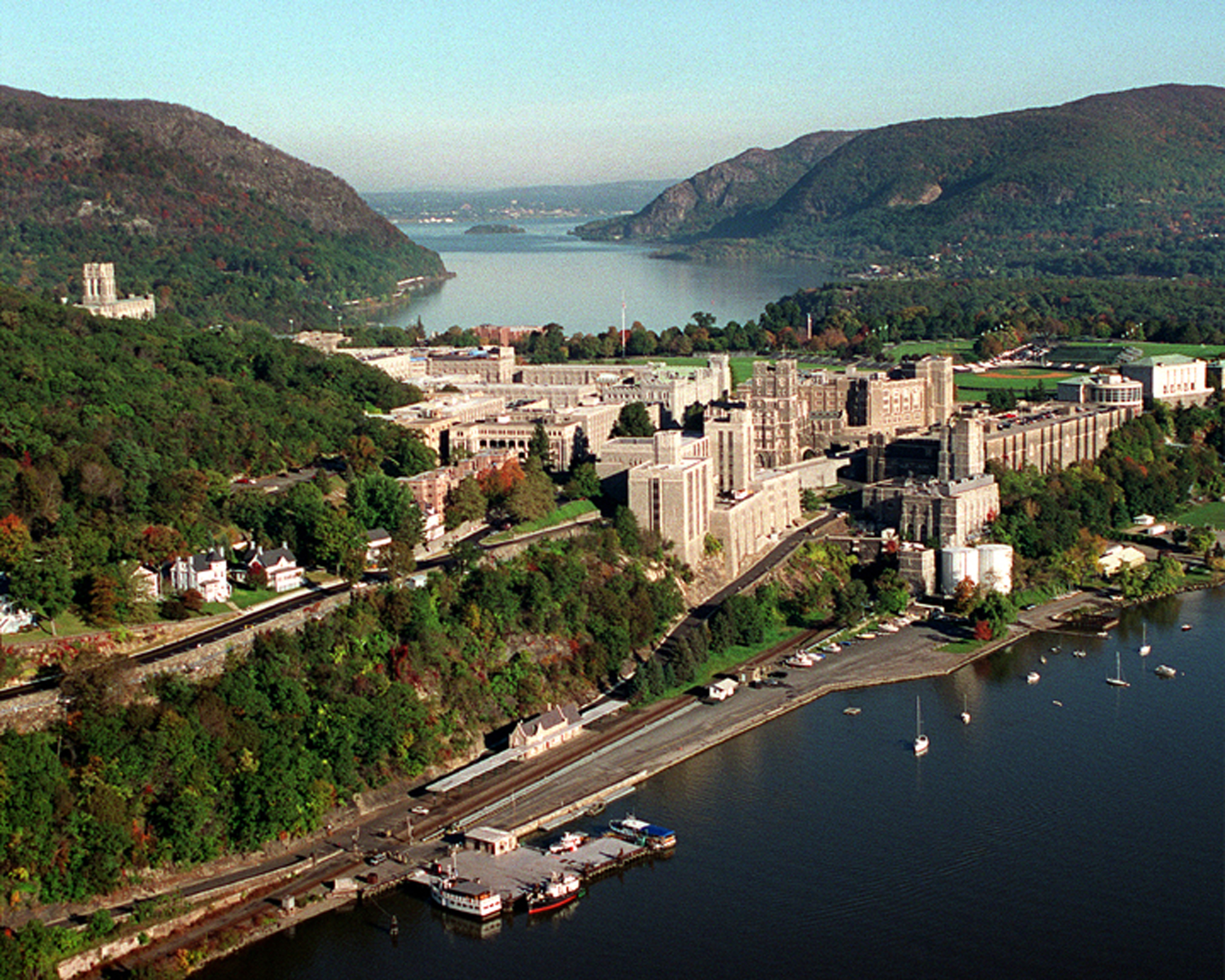
The United States Military Academy on the Hudson River at West Point was established in 1802.

During Benedict Arnold's control over West Point, he began weakening its defenses, including neglecting repairs on the West Point Chain. At the time, Arnold was secretly loyal to the British, and planned to hand off West Point's plans to British major John André at Snedeker's Landing (or Waldberg Landing) on the wooded west shore of Haverstraw Bay. On September 21, 1780, André sailed up the river on HMS Vulture to meet Arnold. The next morning, an outpost at Verplanck's Point fired on the ship, which sailed back down river. André was forced to return to New York City by land; however, he was captured near Tarrytown on September 23 by three Westchester militiamen, and later was hanged. Arnold later fled to New York City using HMS Vulture.

== Industrial Revolution and 20th century ==
Following the building of the Erie Canal, the area became an important industrial center. The canal opened the Hudson Valley and New York City to commerce with the Midwest and Great Lakes regions. However, in the mid 20th century, many of the industrial towns went into decline.

The first railroad in New York, the Mohawk and Hudson Railroad, opened in 1831 between Albany and Schenectady on the Mohawk River, enabling passengers to bypass the slowest part of the Erie Canal.

The Hudson Valley proved attractive for railroads, once technology progressed to the point where it was feasible to construct the required bridges over tributaries. The Troy and Greenbush Railroad was chartered in 1845 and opened that same year, running a short distance on the east side between Troy and Greenbush, now known as East Greenbush (east of Albany). The Hudson River Railroad was chartered the next year as a continuation of the Troy and Greenbush south to New York City, and was completed in 1851. In 1866 the Hudson River Bridge opened over the river between Greenbush and Albany, enabling through traffic between the Hudson River Railroad and the New York Central Railroad west to Buffalo. When the Poughkeepsie Bridge opened in 1889, it became the longest single-span bridge in the world.

The New York, West Shore and Buffalo Railway began at Weehawken Terminal and ran up the west shore of the Hudson as a competitor to the merged New York Central and Hudson River Railroad. Construction was slow, and was finally completed in 1884; the New York Central purchased the line the next year.

During the Industrial Revolution, the Hudson River became a major location for production. The river allowed for fast and easy transport of goods from the interior of the Northeast to the coast. Hundreds of factories were built around the Hudson, in towns including Poughkeepsie, Newburgh, Kingston, and Hudson. The North Tarrytown Assembly (later owned by General Motors), on the river in Sleepy Hollow, was a large and notable example. The river links to the Erie Canal and Great Lakes, allowing manufacturing in the Midwest, including automobiles in Detroit, to use the river for transport. With industrialization came new technologies for transport, including steamboats for faster transport. In 1807, the North River Steamboat (later known as Clermont), became the first commercially successful steamboat. It carried passengers between New York City and Albany along the Hudson River. At the end of the 19th century, the Hudson River region of New York State would become the world's largest brick manufacturing region, with 130 brickyards lining the shores of the Hudson River from Mechanicsville to Haverstraw and employing 8,000 people. At its peak, about 1 billion bricks were produced a year, with many being sent to New York City for use in its construction industry.

Tourism became a major industry as early as 1810. With convenient steamboat connections in New York City, and numerous attractive hotels in romantic settings, tourism became an important industry. Early guidebooks were providing suggestions on their itinerary. Middle-class people who read James Fenimore Cooper's novels, or saw the paintings of the Hudson River School, were especially attracted.

In 1965, governor Nelson Rockefeller proposed the Hudson River Expressway, a limited-access highway from the Bronx to Beacon. An 8-mile section was built from Ossining to Peekskill, now part of U.S. Route 9; the rest of the highway was never built due to local opposition.

=== Hudson River School ===
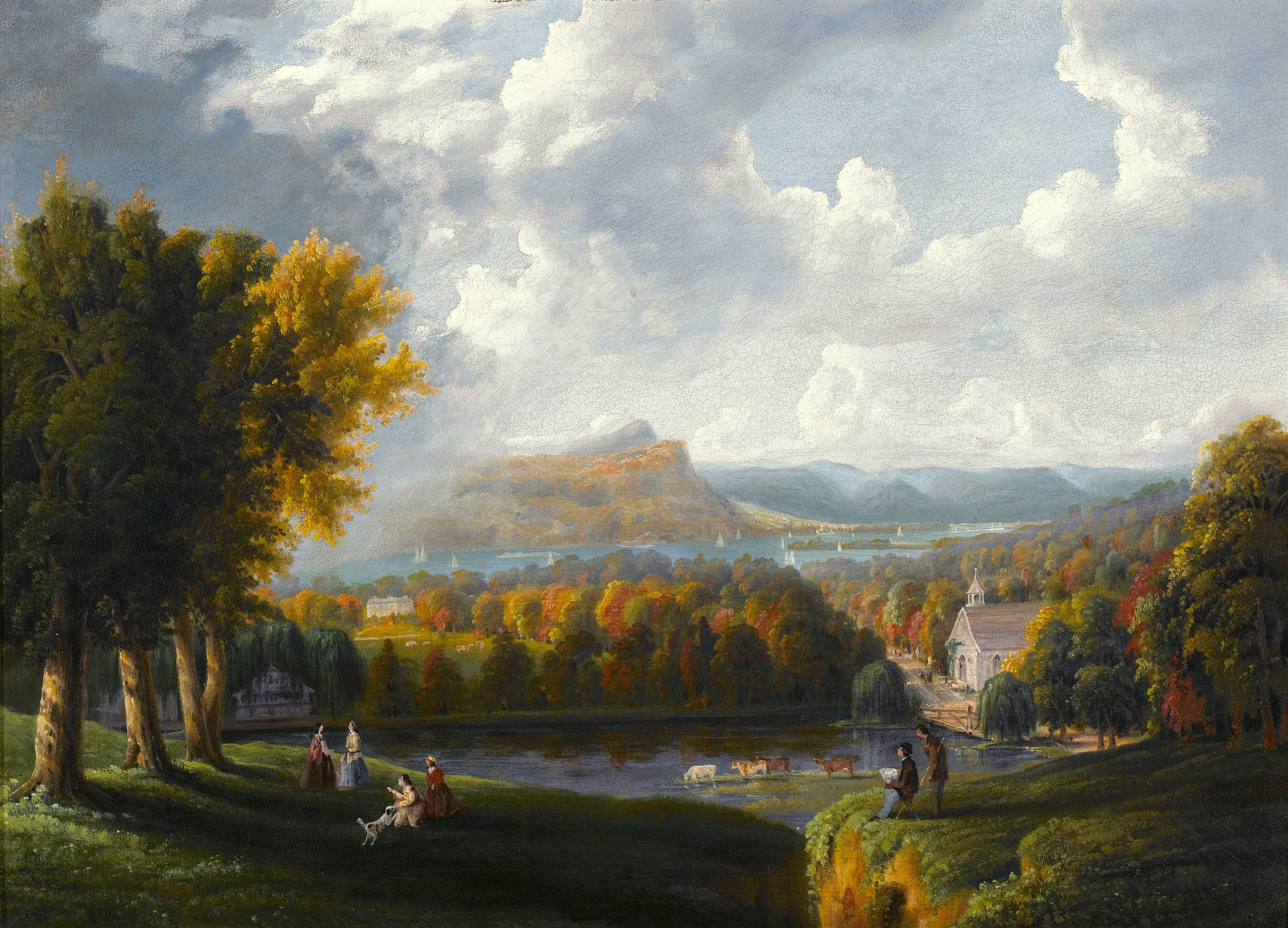
Robert Havell, Jr., View of the Hudson River from Tarrytown, c. 1866

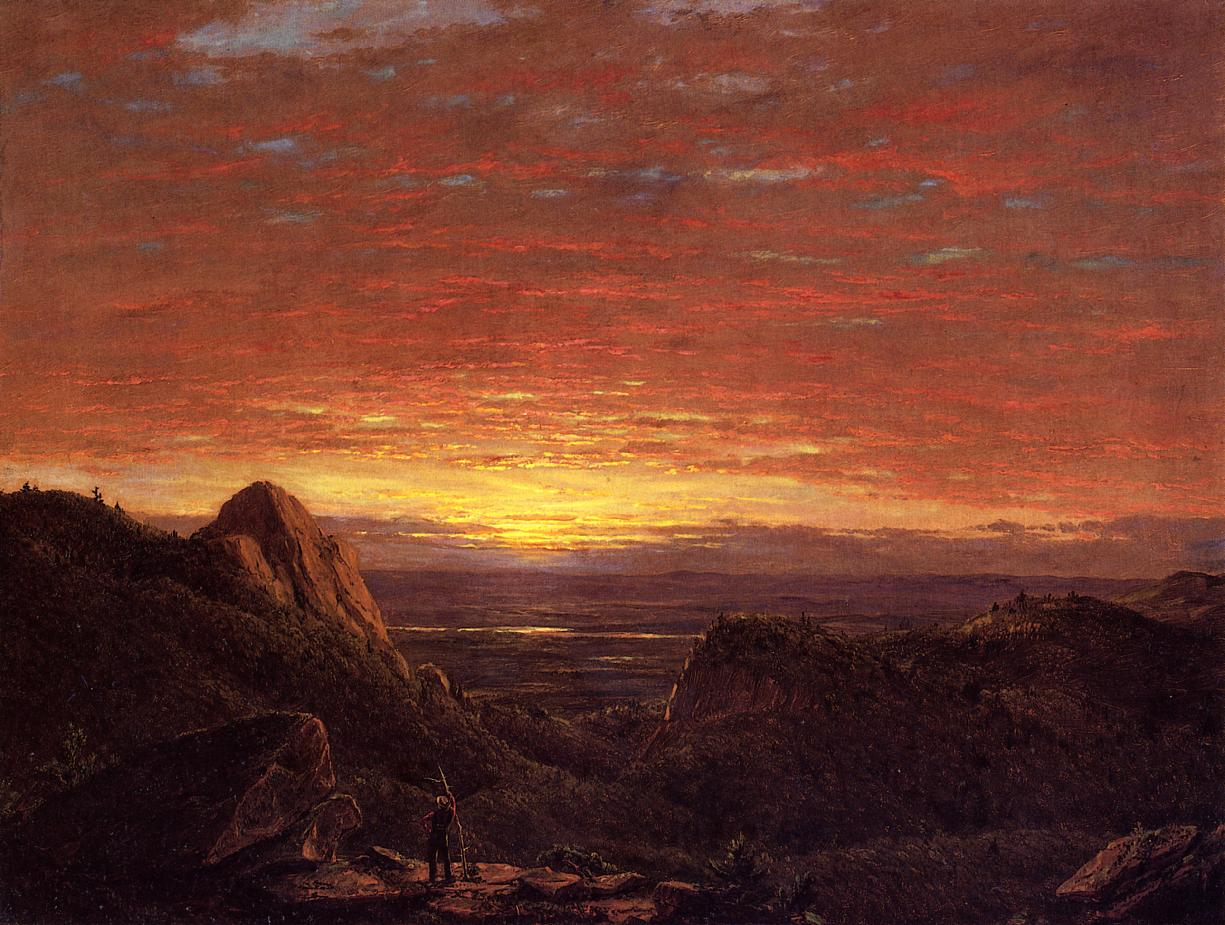
Frederic Edwin Church, Morning, Looking East over the Hudson Valley from Catskill Mountains, 1848

In the early 19th century, popularized by the stories of Washington Irving, the Hudson Valley gained a reputation as a somewhat gothic region inhabited by the remnants of the early days of the Dutch colonization of New York (see, e.g., The Legend of Sleepy Hollow). The area is associated with the Hudson River School, a group of American Romantic painters who worked from about 1830 to 1870.

Hudson River School paintings reflect three themes of America in the 19th century: discovery, exploration, and settlement. The paintings also depict the American landscape as a pastoral setting, where human beings and nature coexist peacefully. Hudson River School landscapes are characterized by their realistic, detailed, and sometimes idealized portrayal of nature, often juxtaposing peaceful agriculture and the remaining wilderness, which was fast disappearing from the Hudson Valley just as it was coming to be appreciated for its qualities of ruggedness and sublimity. In general, Hudson River School artists believed that nature in the form of the American landscape was an ineffable manifestation of God, though the artists varied in the depth of their religious conviction. They took as their inspiration such European masters as Claude Lorrain, John Constable and J. M. W. Turner. Their reverence for America's natural beauty was shared with contemporary American writers such as Henry David Thoreau and Ralph Waldo Emerson. The Düsseldorf school of painting had a direct influence on the Hudson River School.

The school characterizes the artistic body, its New York location, its landscape subject matter, and often its subject, the Hudson River. While the elements of the paintings were rendered realistically, many of the scenes were composed as a synthesis of multiple scenes or natural images observed by the artists. In gathering the visual data for their paintings, the artists would travel to extraordinary and extreme environments, which generally had conditions that would not permit extended painting at the site. During these expeditions, the artists recorded sketches and memories, returning to their studios to paint the finished works later.

The artist Thomas Cole is generally acknowledged as the founder of the Hudson River School. Cole took a steamship up the Hudson in the autumn of 1825, the same year the Erie Canal opened, stopping first at West Point, then at Catskill landing. He hiked west high up into the eastern Catskill Mountains of New York State to paint the first landscapes of the area. The first review of his work appeared in the New York Evening Post on November 22, 1825. At that time, only the English native Cole, born in a landscape where autumnal tints were of browns and yellows, found the brilliant autumn hues of the area to be inspirational. Cole's close friend, Asher Durand, became a prominent figure in the school as well. Painters Frederic Edwin Church and Albert Bierstadt were the most successful painters of the school.

== Contemporary ==
On October 3, 2009, the Poughkeepsie-Highland Railroad Bridge reopened as the Walkway over the Hudson. It is a pedestrian walkway over the Hudson River that opened as part of the Hudson River Quadricentennial Celebrations, and it connects over 25 miles of existing pedestrian trails.
