= Fort Clinton =

Fort on the Hudson River during the American Revolutionary War

Coordinates: 41°19′15″N 73°59′17″W

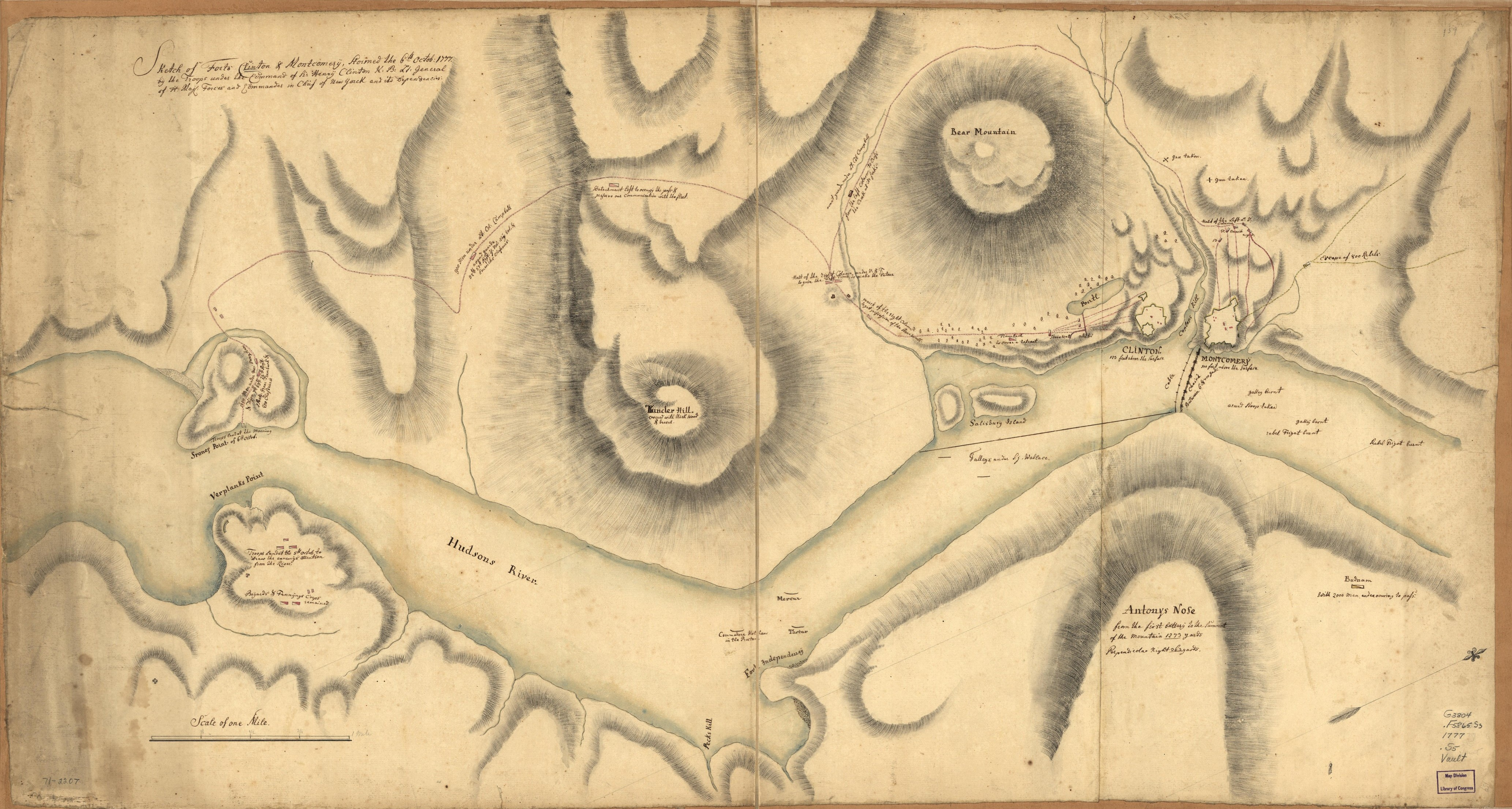
Fort Clinton and Fort Montgomery are right of center on this 1777 map

Fort Clinton was an American Revolutionary War fort erected by the Continental Army on the west bank of the Hudson River in 1776.

Fort Clinton was also the site of the original West Point academy.

== Protecting the chain ==
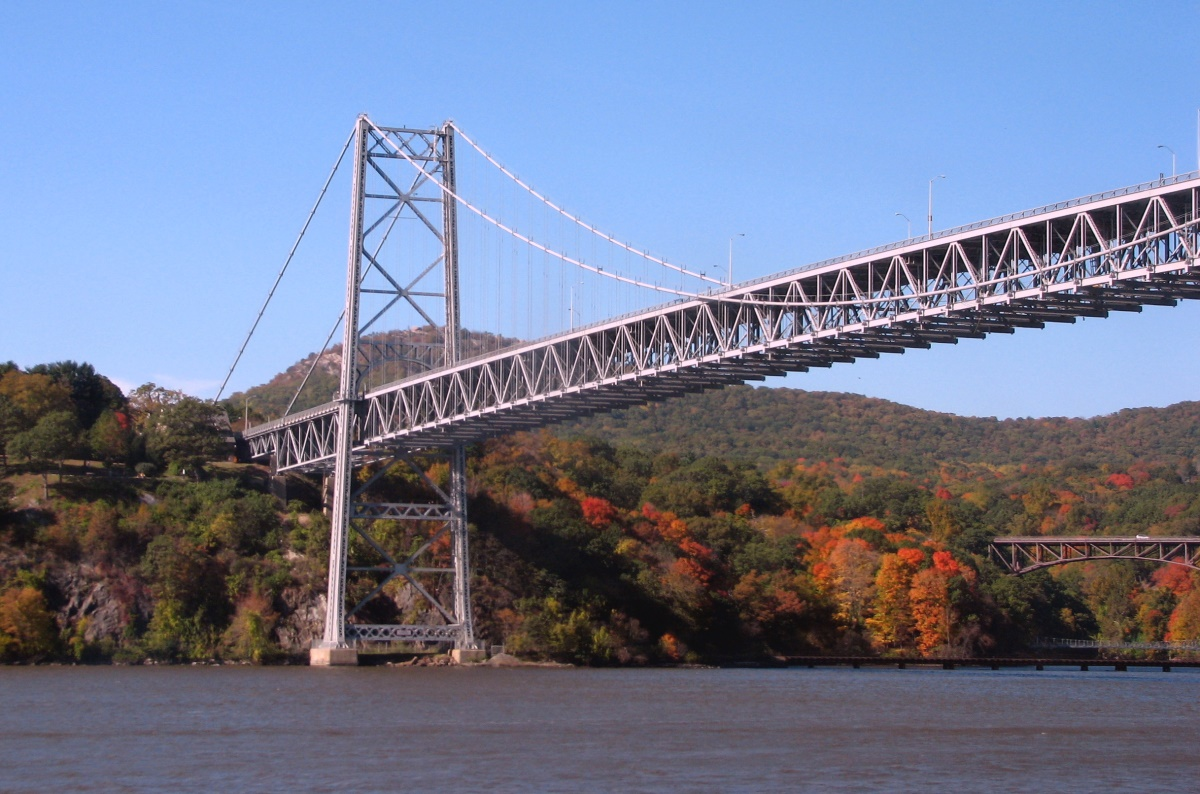
The Fort Clinton site is near the west end of the Bear Mountain Bridge

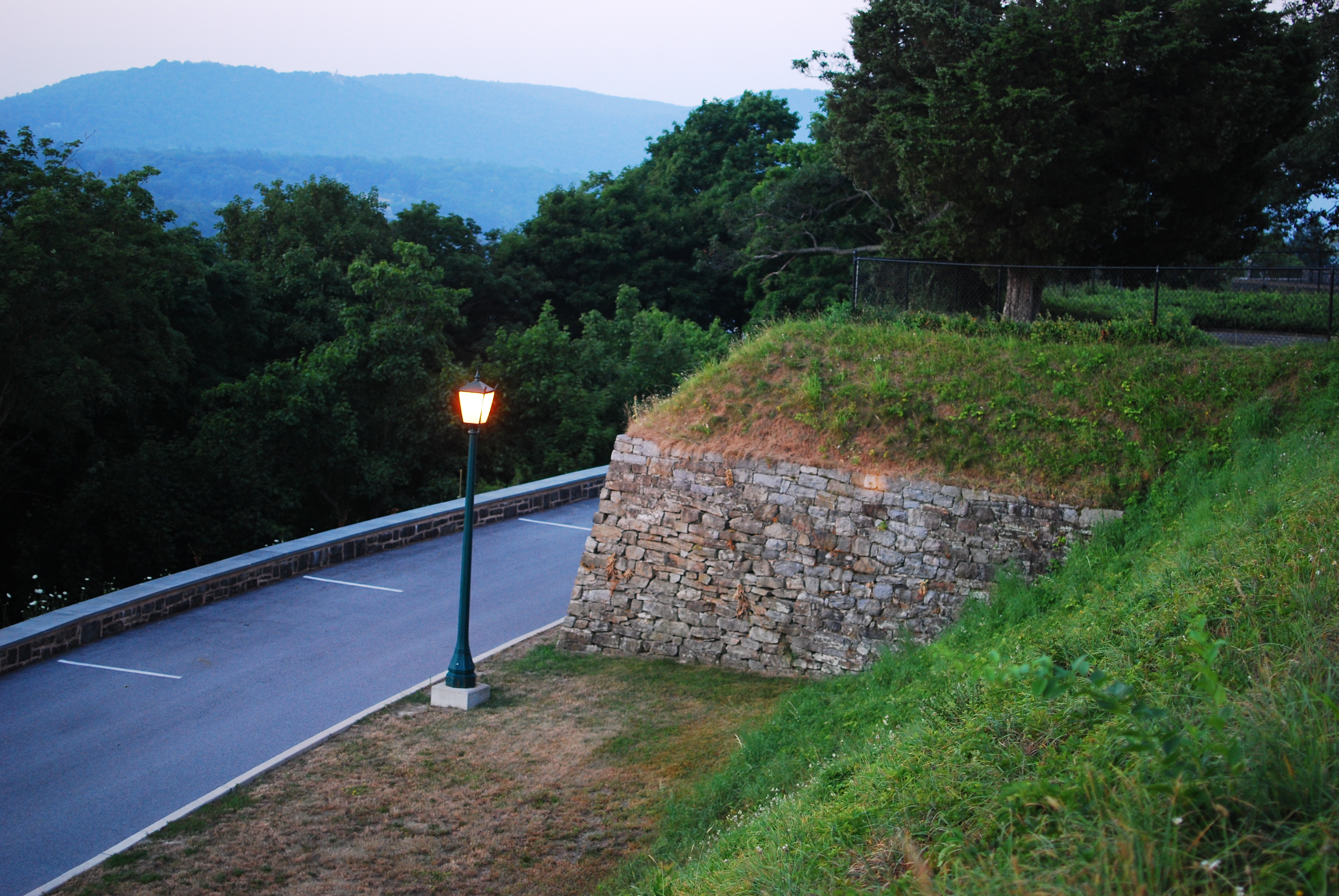
Remaining (restored) wall of Fort Clinton as seen from Kosciuszko's Monument

It was one of a pair of fortifications which straddled the confluence of Popolopen Creek, standing on the south side of Popolopen Gorge, with Fort Montgomery to the north. The forts defended a huge wrought iron chain that spanned the Hudson from Fort Montgomery to Anthony's Nose on the river's east side. The sites of both forts are in present-day Highlands, Orange County, New York.

Fort Clinton's garrison of 300 soldiers was smaller than Fort Montgomery's, but it was built on higher ground, and its defenses were more complete. It was commanded by General James Clinton, for whom it was named (and not his brother, General George Clinton, or Sir Henry Clinton, the British Commander-in-Chief in North America and opposing general in the struggle over control of the strategically critical river).

== Battle of Forts Clinton and Montgomery ==
On October 6, 1777, Forts Clinton and Montgomery were attacked by the British 63rd Regiment led by Sir Henry Clinton (a distant relative of James Clinton, according to information at the Fort Montgomery state historic site museum). The Battle of Forts Clinton and Montgomery was intense but brief, with both forts being overrun within an hour and the wounded General James Clinton retreating with his men through Popolopen Gorge. The forts were razed by the British, and the iron chain they sought to defend was dismantled. The Rebels installed another Hudson River Chain farther upriver.

Although the ruins of Fort Montgomery survive and the site is a National Historic Landmark, the Fort Clinton site was destroyed in the 1920s during the construction of U.S. Route 9W and the Bear Mountain Bridge. Today, the Fort Clinton site lies within Bear Mountain State Park and is used for the Trailside Museum and Zoo.
