= Fort Montgomery (Hudson River) =

State historic site of New York, US

- Fort Montgomery State Historic Site
- U.S. National Register of Historic Places
- U.S. National Historic Landmark
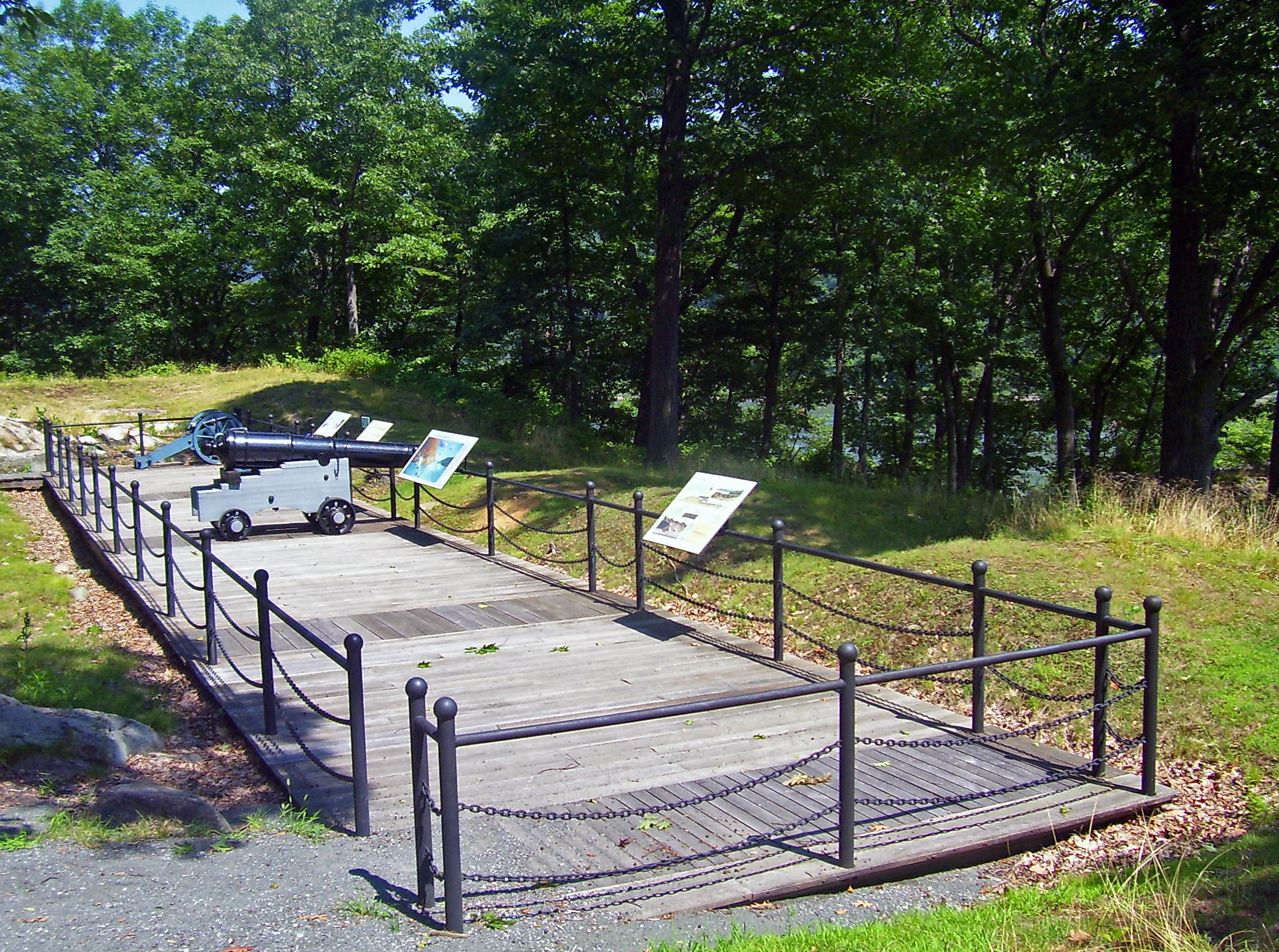
- Cannons at the site of the fort, 2007
- Location: Fort Montgomery, Highlands, New York, US
- Nearest city: Peekskill
- Coordinates: 41°19′26″N 73°59′13″W
- Built: 1776
- NRHP reference No.: 72000897

Significant dates
- Added to NRHP: November 28, 1972
- Designated NHL: November 28, 1972

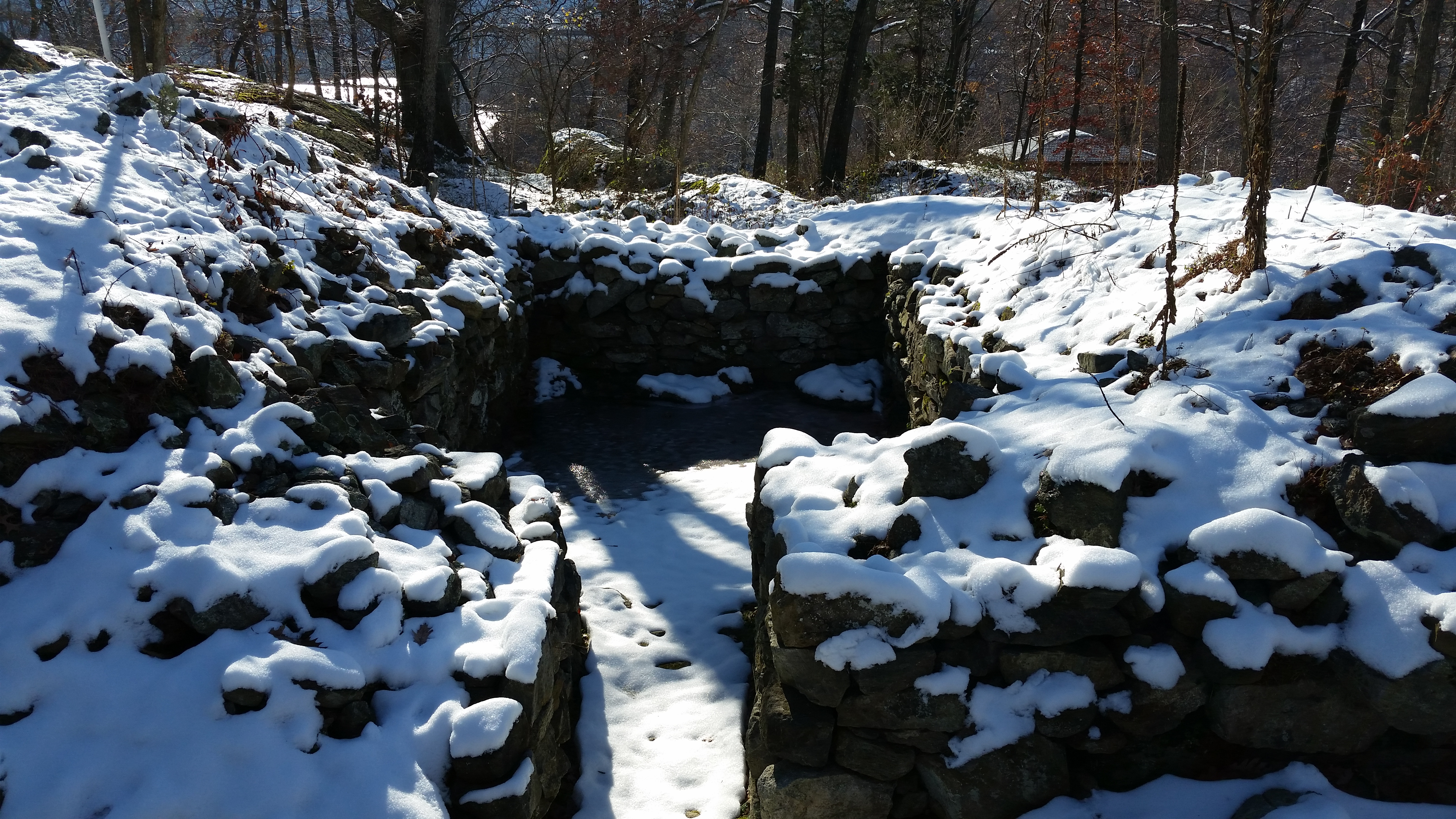
Foundation of magazine

Fort Montgomery is a former fortification built on the west bank of the Hudson River in Highlands, New York by the Continental Army during the American Revolution. Erected in 1776, Fort Montgomery was one of the first major investments by the Americans in strategic construction projects.

Declared a National Historic Landmark, it is part of the Hudson River Valley National Heritage Area, owned and operated by the state of New York as the Fort Montgomery State Historic Site.

== Background ==
The strategic importance of the ability to control navigation along the Hudson River was obvious to both the Americans and the British from the outbreak of open hostilities. The Hudson was the major means for transportation of supplies and troops throughout a large portion of the northeast. The fort was constructed at a site noted as early as the seventeenth century for its strategic advantage in controlling navigation along the river.

A month after the first open armed conflict in Lexington, the Continental Congress resolved on May 25, 1775 to build fortifications in the Hudson highlands for the purpose of preventing the British from gaining control of the river and dividing the colonies. It noted that "…a post be also taken in the Highlands on each side of Hudson's River and batteries erected in such a manner as will most effectually prevent any vessels passing that may be sent to harass the inhabitants on the borders of said river…"

== Fort Constitution ==
James Clinton and Christopher Tappan, both lifetime residents of the area, were sent to scout appropriate locations. The initial site chosen was further to the north, on Martlaer's Island, across from West Point. Plans for the fort called for four bastions. Construction of the fortifications began in the summer of 1775. By November it had 70 cannons. However, difficulties in construction and management of the original plan of fortifications, together with escalating costs, led to abandonment of that project. The site on the north side of Popolopen Creek across from Anthony's Nose was proposed, and in January 1776, the materials and resources from Fort Constitution were redirected to the construction at the new site. Construction began on the new Fort Montgomery in March 1776.

== Fort Montgomery ==
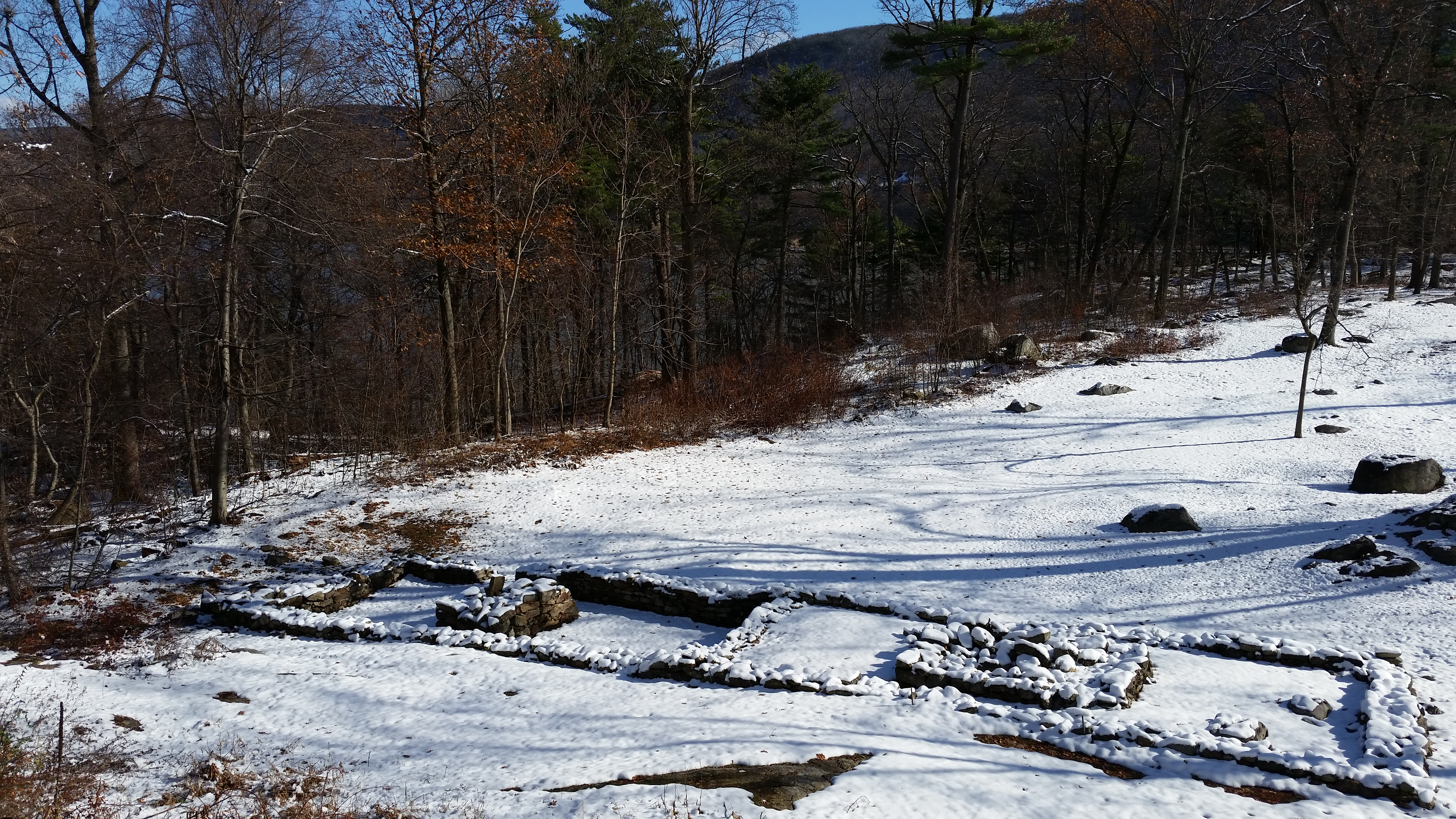
Foundation of barracks

Fort Montgomery was located at the confluence of Popolopen Creek with the Hudson River near Bear Mountain in Orange County, New York. The fortifications included a river battery of six 32-pound cannons, a cable chain supported by a boom across the Hudson River (see Hudson River Chain), and landward redoubts connected by ramparts, all situated on a cliff promontory rising 100 feet (30 m) above the river. The fort was commanded by General George Clinton, also the newly appointed Patriot governor of the State. Fort Montgomery and its companion fortification, the smaller Fort Clinton, on the southern bank of the Popolopen, held a combined garrison of roughly 700 Colonial soldiers. These men were from the 5th NY Regiment, Lamb's Artillery, Orange County Militia, and Ulster County Militia.

The strategic importance of the opposite bank of Popolopen Creek was quickly realized, as it was an elevated cliff terrace with a full view of the Fort Montgomery site and could not be left undefended. These two forts and their associated cannon batteries effectively controlled this stretch of the Hudson River. The Army also conceived a major engineering project to effectively blockade any naval traffic headed north on the river. In 1776 a chain and boom were built across the river to provide a physical barrier to ships, in addition to the combined firepower of the fortifications, which could be massed against ships.

In July 1776, the New York convention appointed a committee, including John Jay, Robert Livingston, George Clinton and Robert Yates, to "devise and carry into execution" measures for "obstructing the channel of Hudson's river, or annoying the navigation of the said River." Worried about lack of arms, the committee worked to buy more cannons.

== Battle of Fort Montgomery ==
On October 6, 1777, a combined force of roughly 2,100 Loyalists, Hessians, and British regulars led by Lieutenant General Sir Henry Clinton attacked forts Montgomery and Clinton from the landward side (where the defenses were only partially completed). They had support from cannon fire from British ships on the Hudson River that had passed through the chevaux de frise on the lower river. The land columns attacking from west of the fort consisted of the New York Volunteers, the Loyal American Regiment, Emmerich's Chasseurs, the 57th and the 52nd Regiments of Foot. By the end of the day, both forts had fallen to the British, who burned the forts and tore down the stonework buildings.

The battle was strategically barren for the British, however. Their campaign against the forts caused delays in reinforcing General John Burgoyne at Saratoga. Americans gained the upper hand at the Battle of Bemis Heights and forced the surrender of Burgoyne ten days later at the Battle of Saratoga, when the reinforcements were still far to the south.

== Historic Site ==
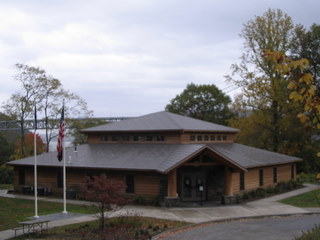
Visitor center, 2008

The site was declared a National Historic Landmark in 1972. A system of trails and interpretive signs guides visitors through the ruins of the fort. Designed by the architect Salvatore Cuciti, the 5,700-square-foot (530 m^{2}) Visitor Center opened in October 2006. The timber frame building is oriented to provide visitors with a "gun sight" view down the Hudson. Operated as a state museum, it contains artifacts from the site, mannequins representing military units and a detailed model of the fort.

== See also ==
- Bear Mountain State Park
- List of National Historic Landmarks in New York
- List of New York State Historic Sites
