= Popolopen =

Mountain in the United States

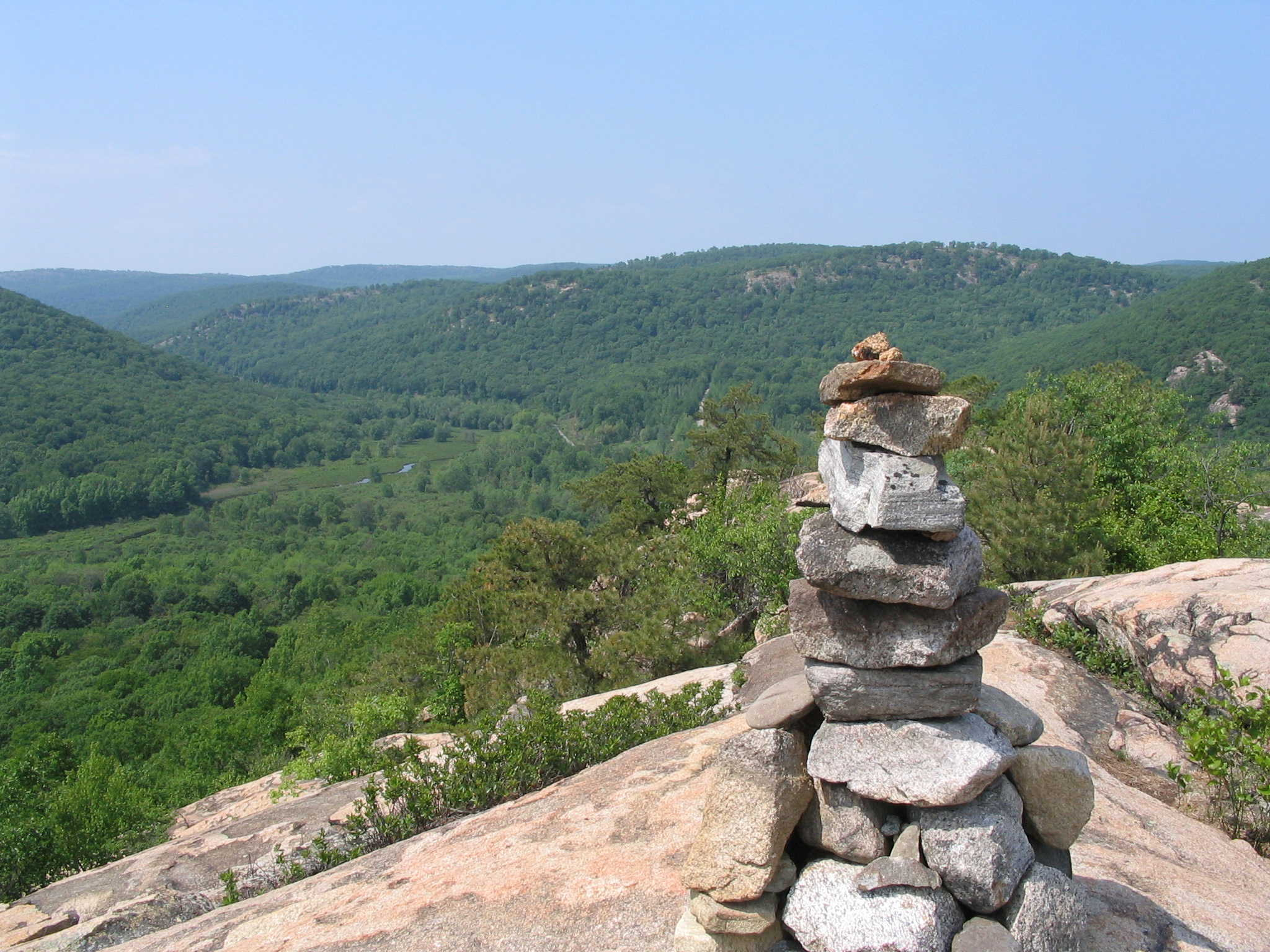
- Summit of Popolopen Torne in 2006, facing northwest, with Cranberry Brook and the military reservation below.

Highest point
- Elevation: 942 ft (287 m)
- Coordinates: 41°19′37″N 74°00′37″W

Naming
- Language of name: Dutch

Geography
- Location: Highlands, Orange County, New York, U.S.
- Parent range: Hudson Highlands
- Topo map: New York New Jersey Trail Conference #119

Climbing
- Easiest route: Hike

Popolopen is the name of several related landmarks mainly within the Hudson Highlands of Orange County, New York. These include a peak, Popolopen Torne—or simply "The Torne," and a short and steep-sided nearby valley officially called Hell Hole, but often Popolopen Gorge. Popolopen Creek runs through this valley. The Popolopen Bridge spans its mouth at the Hudson River and is crossed by Route 9W. Popolopen Lake feeds the headwaters of its namesake creek. Despite local usage, the United States Board on Geographical Names recognizes only the lake, creek and bridge as bearing the name "Popolopen."

== Popolopen Torne ==
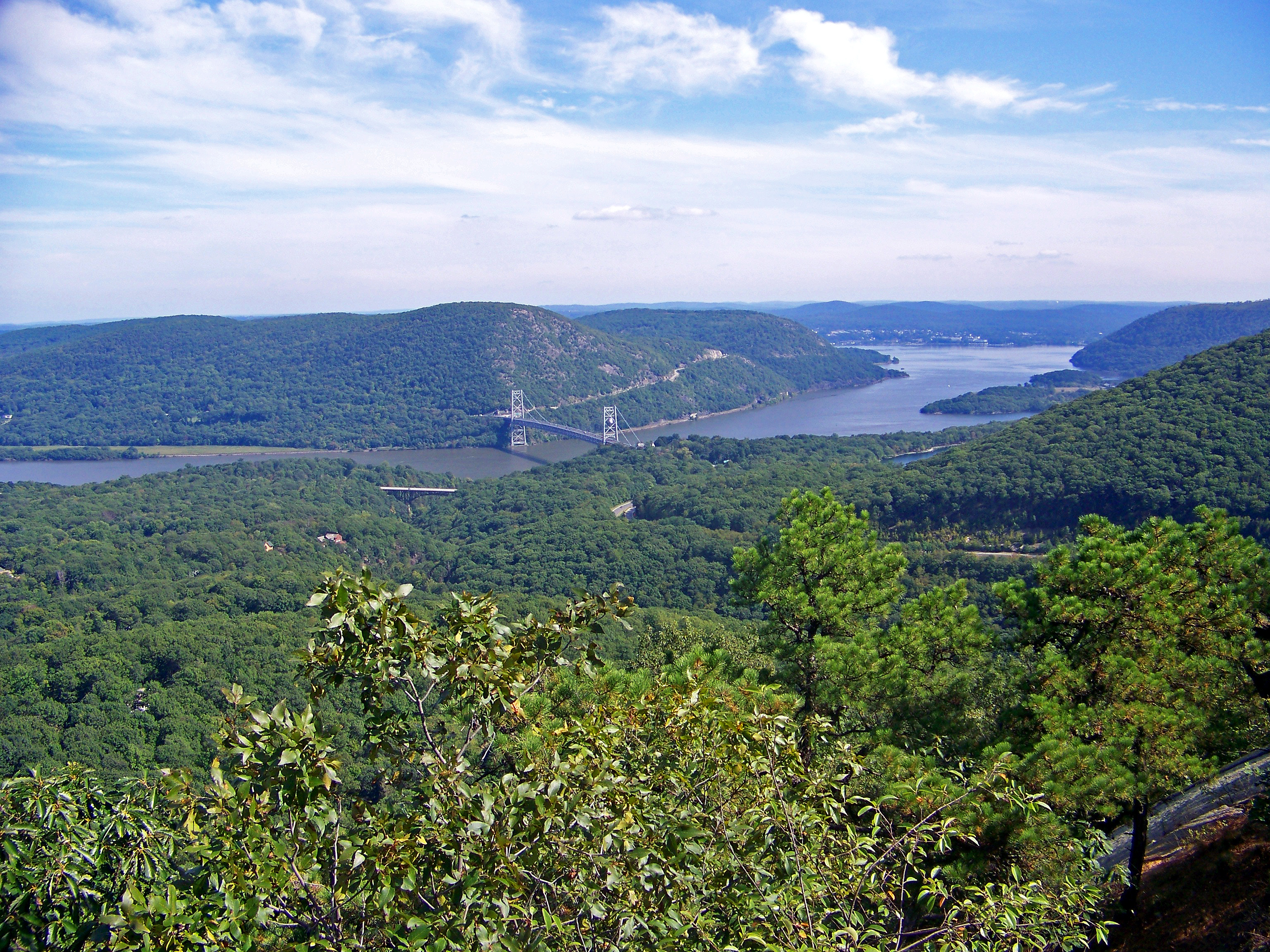
Looking east from the Torne, with Bear Mountain Bridge across the Hudson River

Popolopen Torne (officially called "The Torne") is a small peak with a relatively sharp and barren summit, part of the Hudson Highlands, at 942 feet (287 meters) above sea level. The blue-blazed, horseshoe-shaped Timp Torne trail makes a loop from Mine Torne Road to the summit and back again. Its short and steep ascent offers views of the Hudson River, West Point, Bear Mountain, and Harriman State Park. U.S. Route 6 passes through the valley formed between Popolopen Torne and Bear Mountain just before it reaches the Bear Mountain Bridge. The trail has steep, rocky parts. There are scrambles (hands + feet) near the top. There are ropes attached (with knots) in a few spots near the summit to help with the climb.

A memorial at the peak of the Torne was started after 9/11 when retired Army Col. Hank Keirsey began carrying rocks to the summit as tribute, hoping for the safe return of service members. Others followed, and over time, the cairn (pile of rocks) grew. In 2014, an Eagle Scout project (by Grant Nowoichyk) formally dedicated the trail & summit as a memorial to fallen military members; benches were added and improvements were made. The memorial includes a mound of stones (some painted, some with names), flags, photos, plaques, medals, dog tags, and items of remembrance. There are also two benches dedicated to specific service members: Maj. Thomas Kennedy and Lt. Daren Hidalgo.

== Lake Popolopen ==
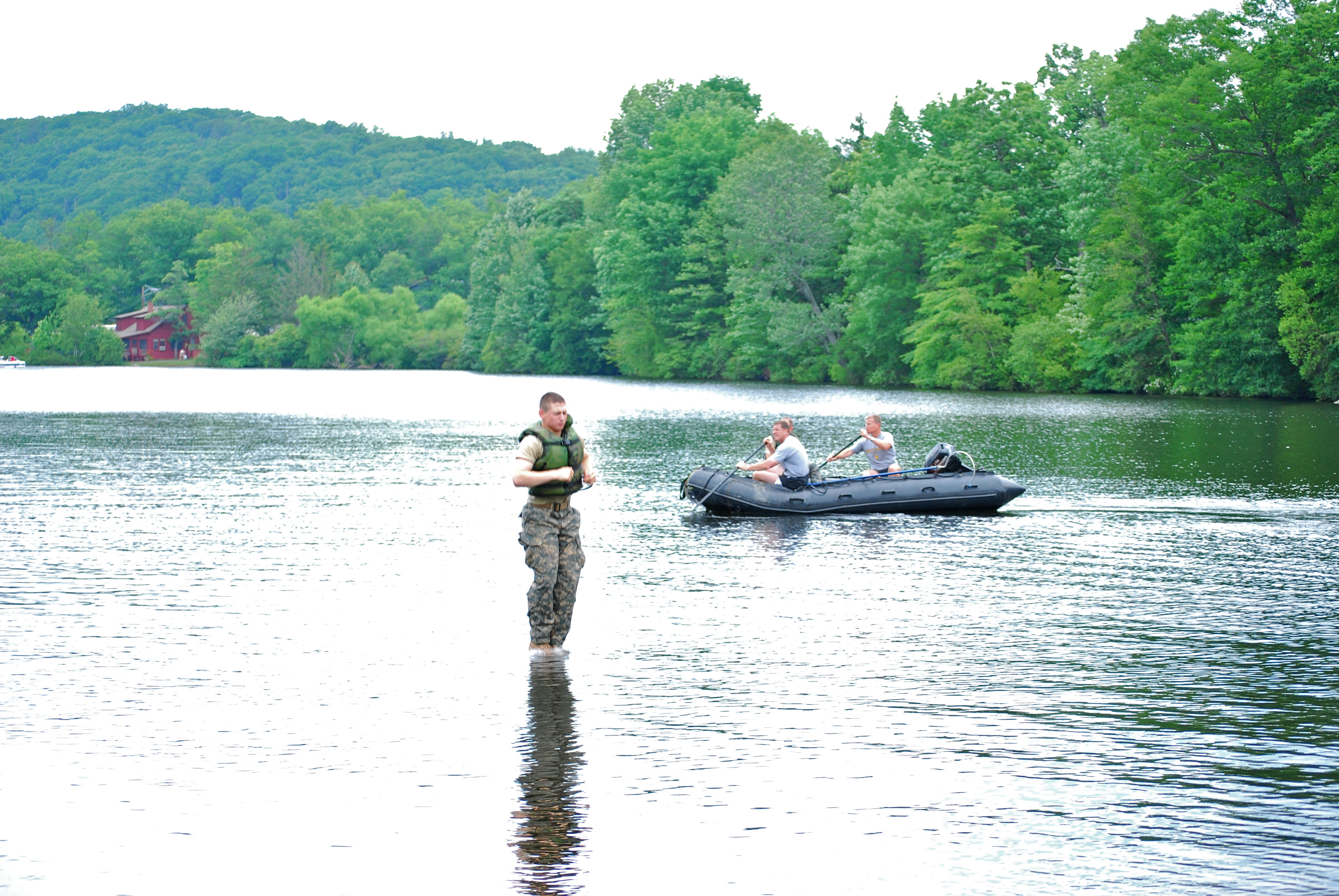
West Point cadet during summer military training on the lake

Lake Popolopen is a lake northwest of the mountain, on the West Point Military Reservation near New York State Route 293. Camp Buckner and Camp Natural Bridge are located at the lake, which is frequently used for training and recreation. The lake comprises the largest body of water at West Point, and is used for aquatic training such as scuba diving and amphibious assault.

In the late nineteenth and early twentieth centuries, cadets from West Point traditionally had a three-day war game dubbed "the Battle of Popolopen" each August. The lake was originally the site of a summer camp. Its waters were drawn to supply nearby mining operations.

During World War II, the Army purchased the land for exclusive military use. It adapted the remains of the summer retreat as Camp Popolopen, a POW camp for German prisoners. After the war, the name was changed to Camp Buckner.

The New York Department of Environmental Conservation began stocking tiger muskies in Lake Popolopen in 2011. 400 fish measuring 10.5" were stocked in 2011, and 800 fish measuring 10.5" were stocked in 2012.

== Popolopen Creek ==
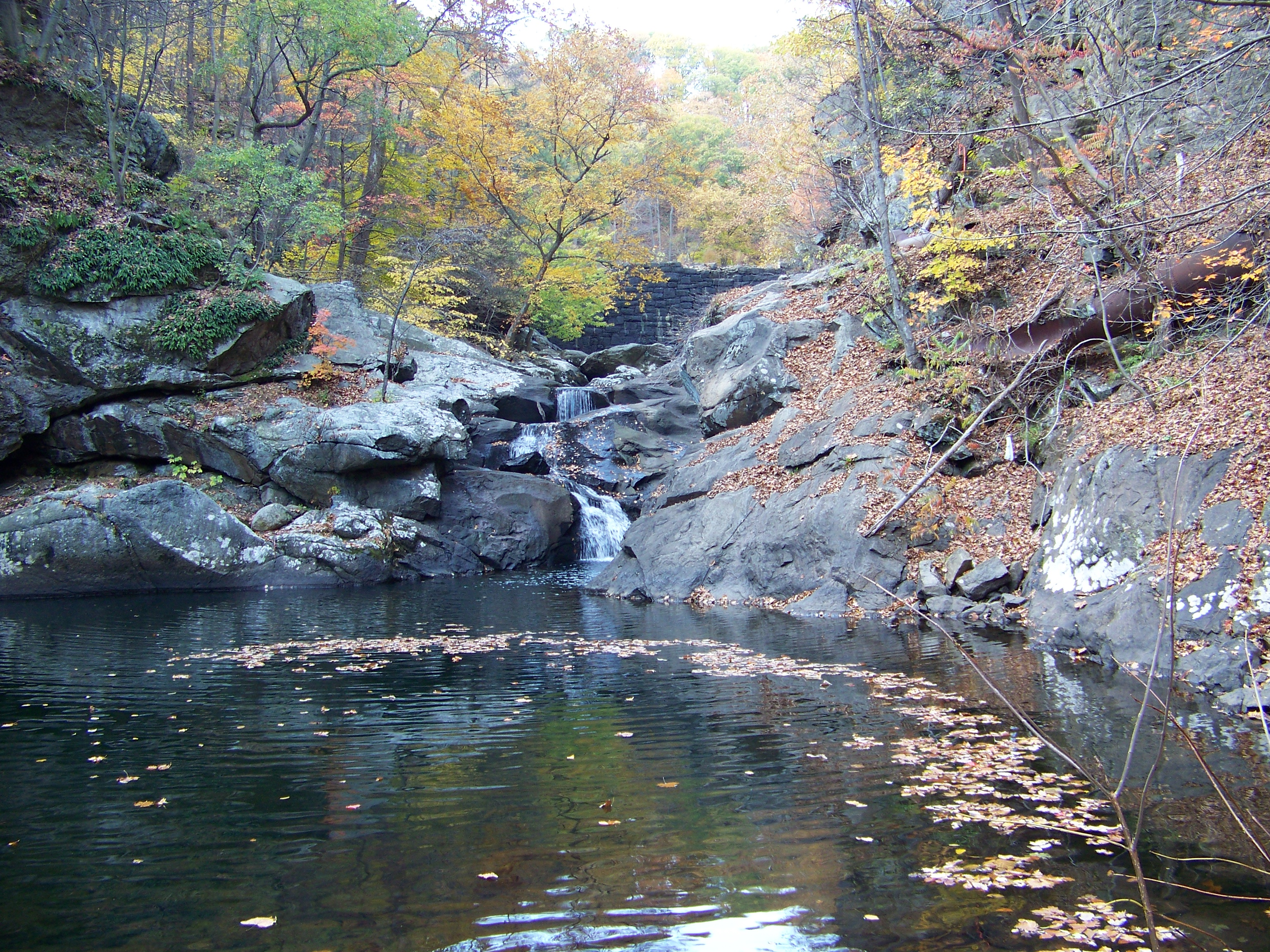
Pool on Popolopen Creek

Popolopen Creek—also called Popolopen Brook—is an approximately 10.4-mile-long (16.7 km) stream, fed mainly by Lake Popolopen, Mine Lake, Stillwell Lake, and Weyant's Pond, eventually draining into the Hudson River. The creek's watershed, or drainage basin, covers about 30 square miles (77 km²) It runs mainly through lands occupied by the US Military Academy, to a gorge between Bear Mountain and Popolopen Torne, and drains to the Hudson River at Fort Clinton, New York.

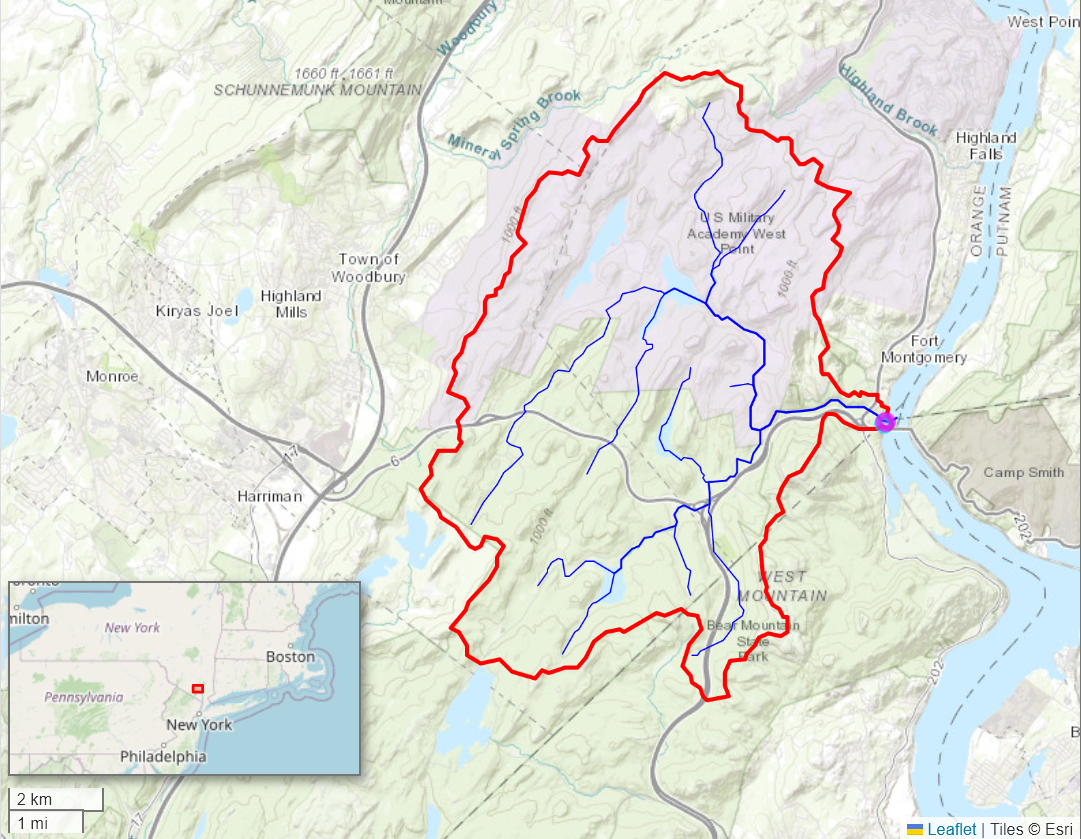
Map of the Popolopen Creek watershed

=== "Hell Hole" ===
Local usage applies "Hell Hole" to a series of small plunge pools within this gorge, although the usage contradicts the U.S. Geological Survey maps and other widely used sources.

The geologist K.E. Lowe wrote that the gorge known as Hell Hole is the result of a fault within a regional intrusion of crystalline rock called Storm King granite. He said, "Despite painstaking investigation, the writer found only one outcrop revealing direct evidence of faulting. A badly weathered, unhealed zone of crushed Storm King granite is exposed in the south wall of upper Hell Hole. Its continuation is unfortunately lost under debris from the construction of [highway] US 6 which mantles most of the Bear Mountain side of the valley."

For most of its length through the gorge, the creek is narrow and extremely rocky, with fast moving rapids and several waterfalls. It can only be reached on foot and is not generally navigable by boat.

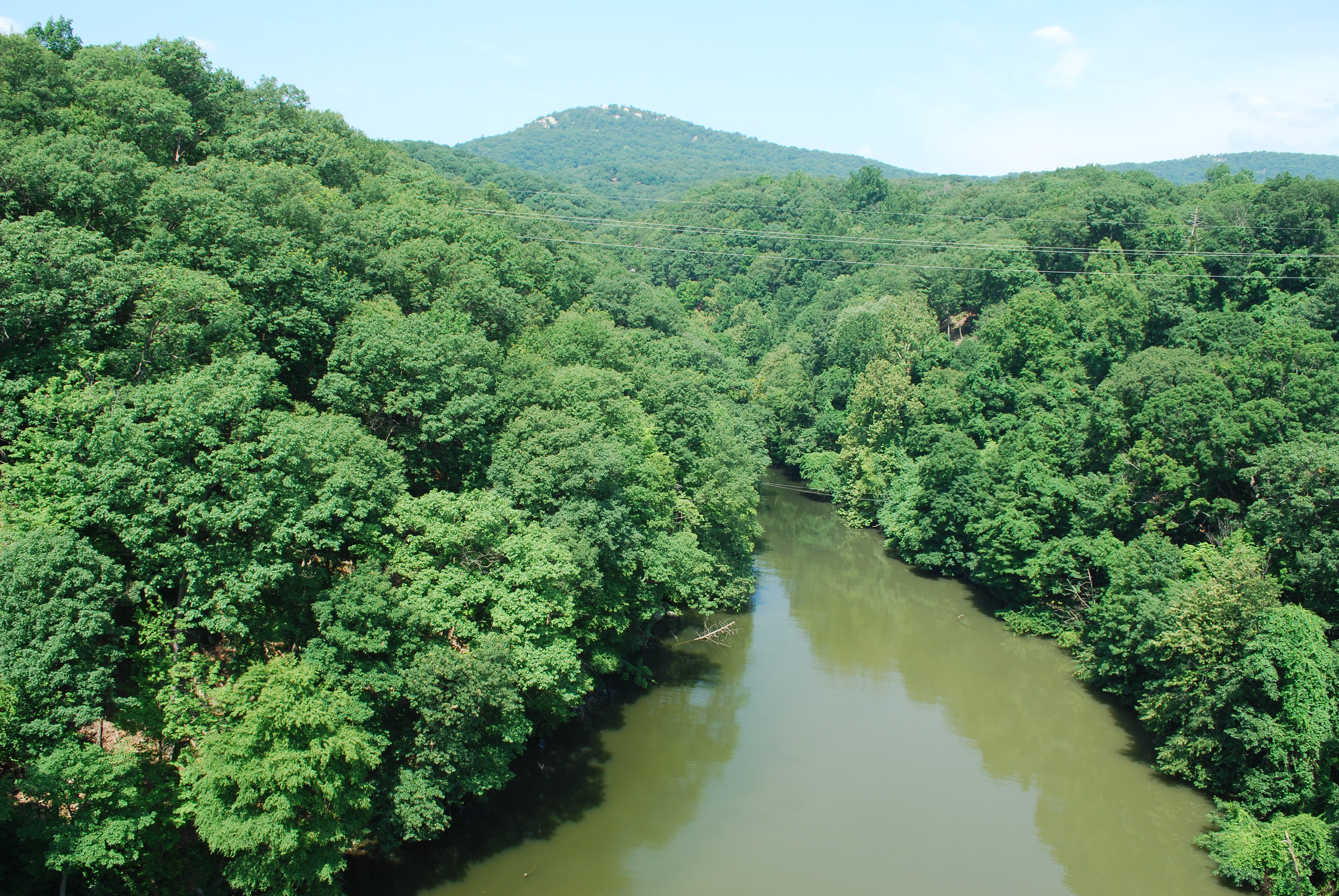
Popolopen Creek with the Torne in the distance, seen from US Rte 9W bridge

The red-blazed Popolopen Gorge Trail runs along the south side of the creek to a foot bridge just south of Popolopen Torne. Here, it joins the blue-blazed Timp-Torne, 1777 West and 1779 trails. These run along the north side of the creek from Hell Hole to the bridge, with the Timp-Torne detouring over the summit of Popolopen Torne. They cross the footbridge and join the Popolopen Gorge Trail to detour around West Point property, and the combined trails turn southwest and follow the valley of Queensboro Brook.

== Popolopen Bridge ==
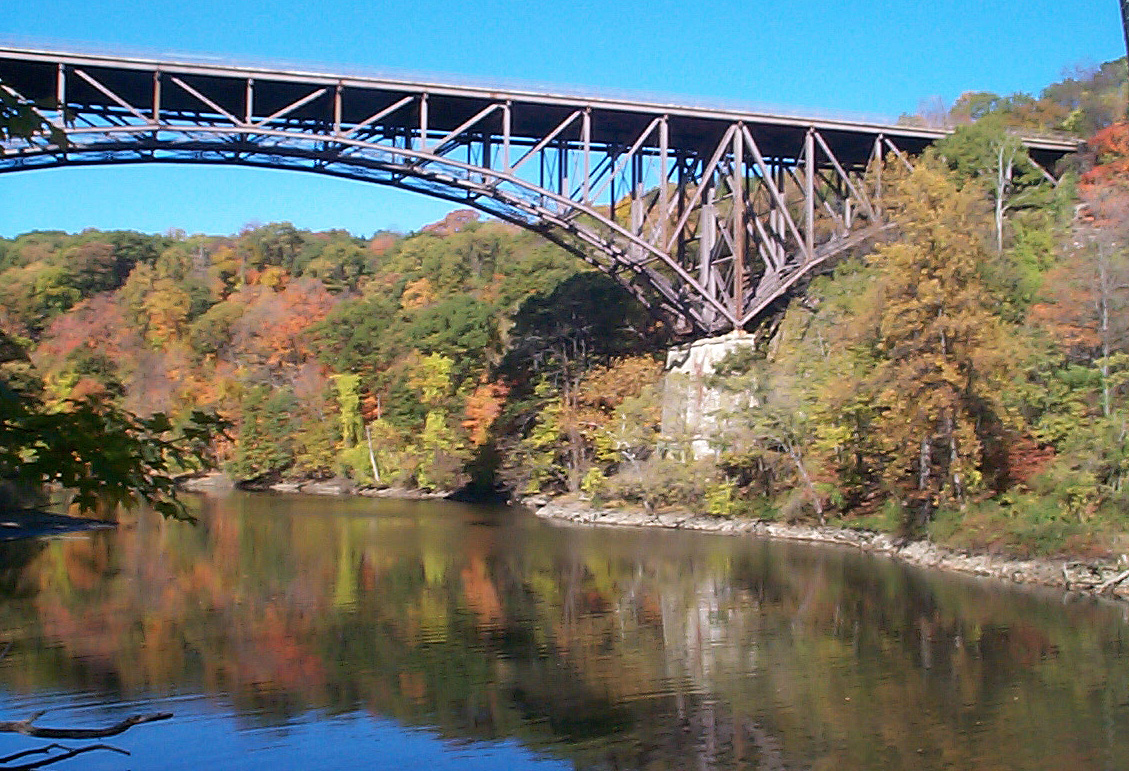
Popolopen Bridge on US Route 9W

During the American Revolution, the mouth of Popolopen Creek was spanned by a pontoon bridge. Much later, the road north from Hessian Lake to Fort Montgomery once crossed the lower part of the gorge by an iron bridge. The steep descents into the gorge and sharp turns onto this bridge made it dangerous for auto traffic. In 1916 the road (then Route 3, renumbered U.S. Route 9W in 1930) was rerouted over a high steel viaduct further downstream, near the site of Fort Montgomery, in 1916. Another bridge was built immediately adjacent in 1936.

Called Popolopen Bridge, the 1936 structure is of the deck truss design, more than 600 feet long, 48 feet wide. It rises about 150 feet above the mouth of Popolopen Creek. As of 2000, its average daily traffic was about 18,000 vehicles. Although rehabilitation was performed in 1992, additional repairs were completed in 2007.

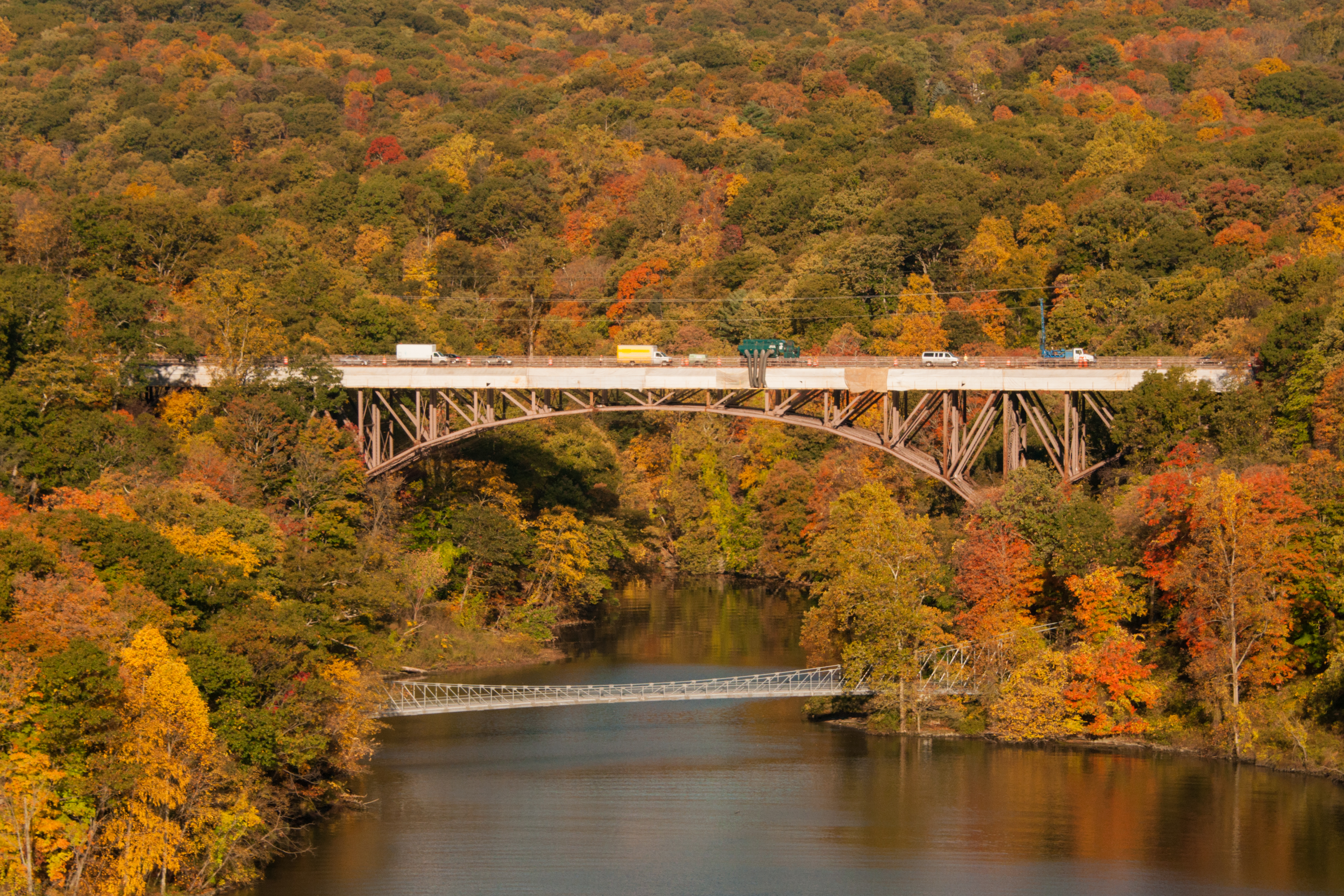
Popolopen Bridge and the smaller pedestrian walkway as viewed from the Bear Mountain Bridge

A footbridge was constructed across the Popolopen Creek just downstream from this bridge in 2002. The concept design of this bridge was proposed by Bruce Ramsay & Jim Hume of Cleveland Bridge Pty. Ltd. of the U.K., Cleveland Bridge were also responsible for its construction. The footbridge was designed as a suspended rope truss, which results in a very stiff bridge due to its diagonal braces. Another special feature is the fiber composite deck in lieu of a traditional timber deck for this type of structure. The fiber composite deck adds lightness, long term durability and reduced maintenance requirements. The bridge is of similar design to the Wheeling Suspension Bridge in West Virginia.

== Industry ==
Iron mining and smelting once took place along the upper reaches of Popolopen Creek. The Forest of Dean Mine produced iron ore from the Revolutionary era into the twentieth century, and operated a narrow gauge railroad along the creek as far as the eastern slopes of Popolopen Torne. The mine site has been submerged by Stilwell Lake. Queensboro Furnace, located just above the outlet of Queensboro Brook into the creek, smelted iron during the late eighteenth century. The remains of the furnace have been preserved, as part of the grounds of the West Point Military Reservation.

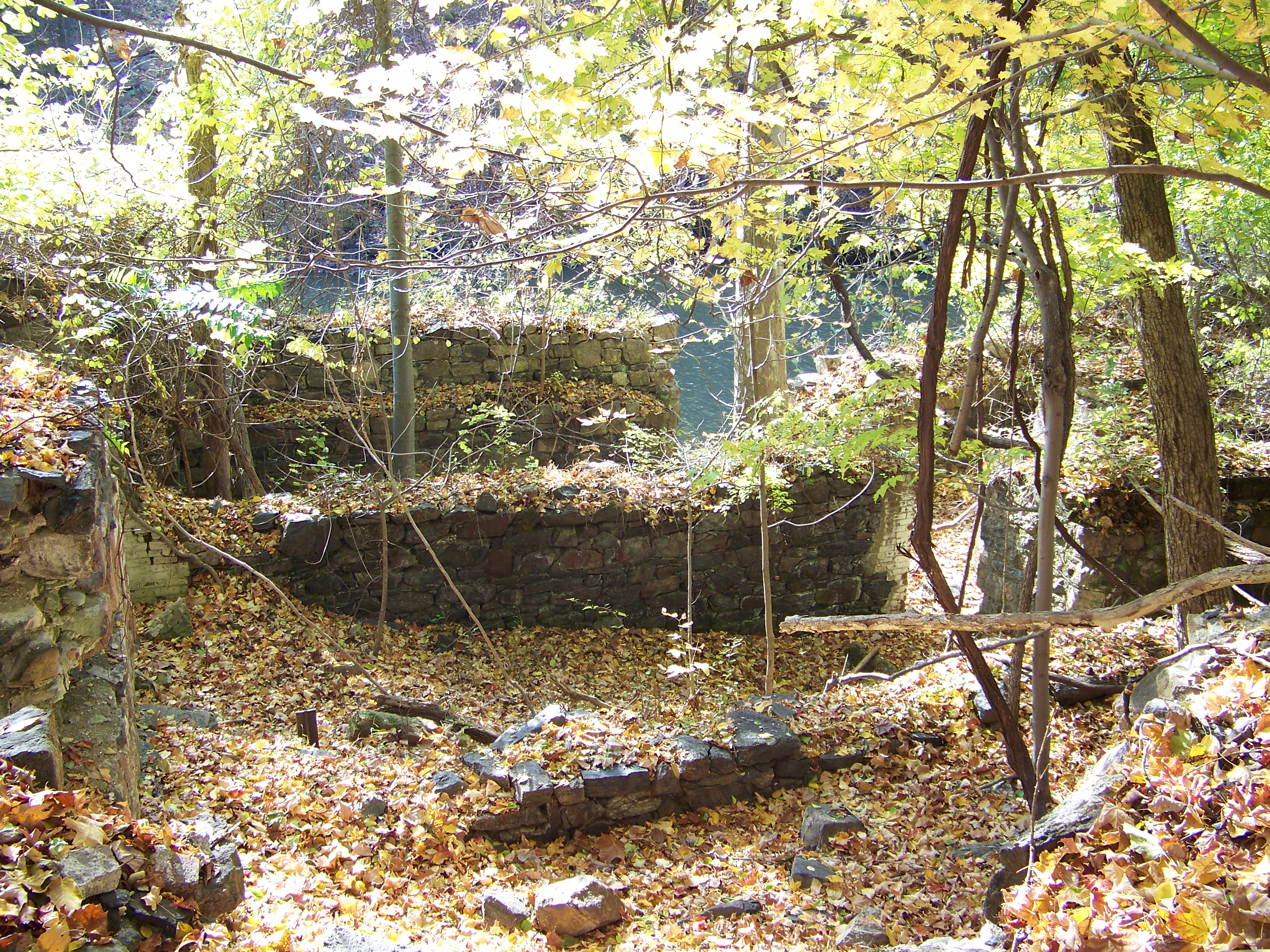
The ruins of the mill, 2007

A grist mill was built in 1799 by Eugene Lucet. The Route 9W highway crossing was later constructed downriver from this. A dam was built upstream in 1901, just above the old Hell Hole bridge, to improve the water supply to the mill. The dam is still intact, and water pools behind it when the creek flow exceeds that of the outlet near the bottom. This intermittent body of water is marked "Roe Pond" on some maps; at least one other pond in the area has the same name. Later converted to a hydroelectric plant, the mill building was demolished in the 1950s.

An aqueduct was built on the north side of the gorge in 1906 to bring water from Queensboro Brook and Popolopen Creek to West Point. Another was built on the south side in 1929–30 to supply Bear Mountain State Park with water from Queensboro Lake. Repairs to the latter required the closing of the combined Popolopen Gorge–1777 West–1779–Timp-Torne trails from the fall of 2008 to spring 2009.
