= Naval Academy Chapel =

Church building in Maryland, United States of America

Coordinates: 38°58′53.57″N 76°29′10.64″W

Brigade of Midshipmen Chapel
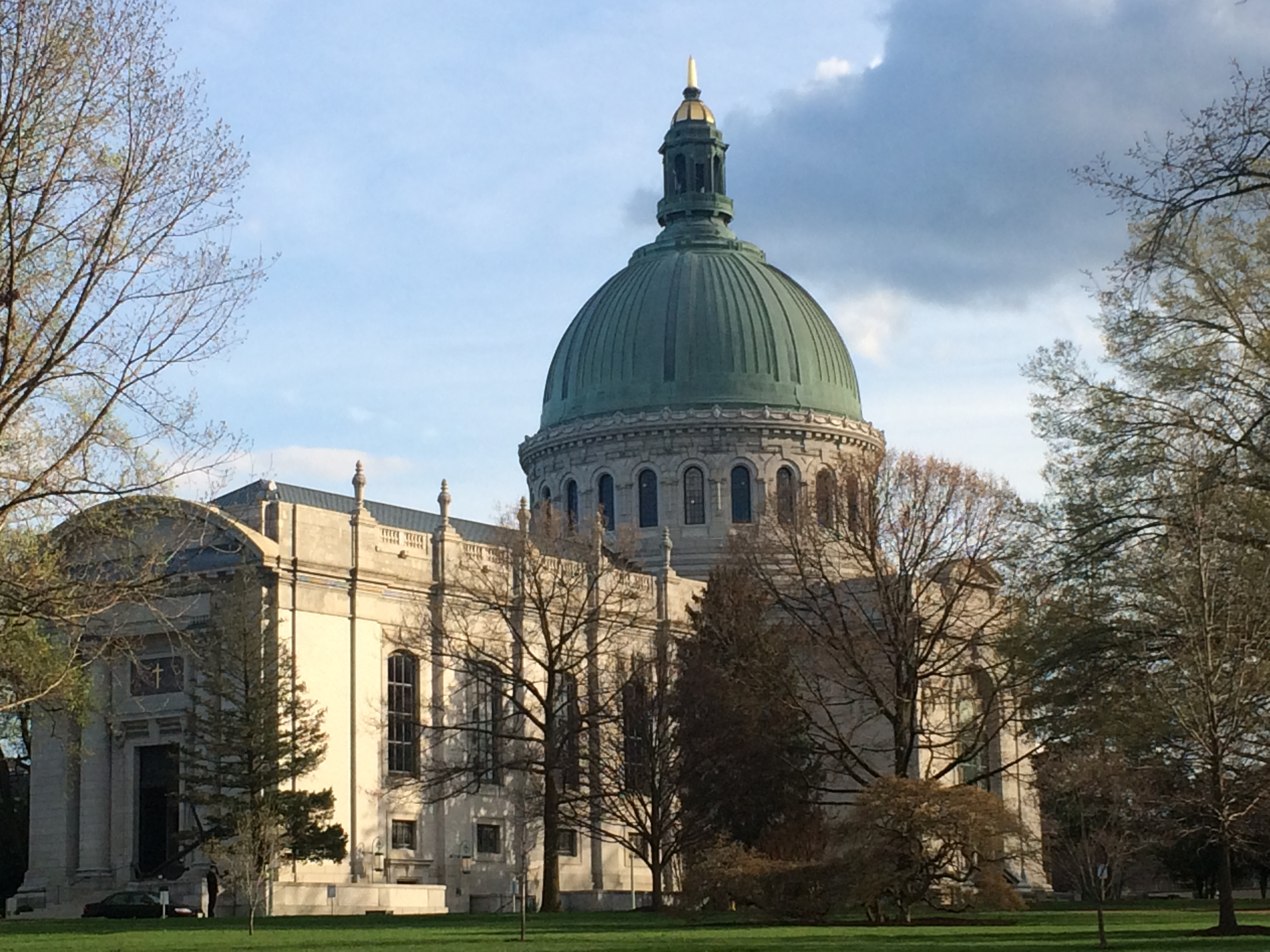
- Brigade of Midshipmen Chapel

Religion
- Affiliation: Christian
- Ecclesiastical or organisational status: Chapel
- Year consecrated: 1908

Location
- Location: 101 Cooper Rd; Annapolis, Maryland, United States
- Interactive map of Brigade of Midshipmen Chapel

Architecture
- Groundbreaking: 1904
- Completed: 1908
- Capacity: 2500

Website
- www.usna.edu

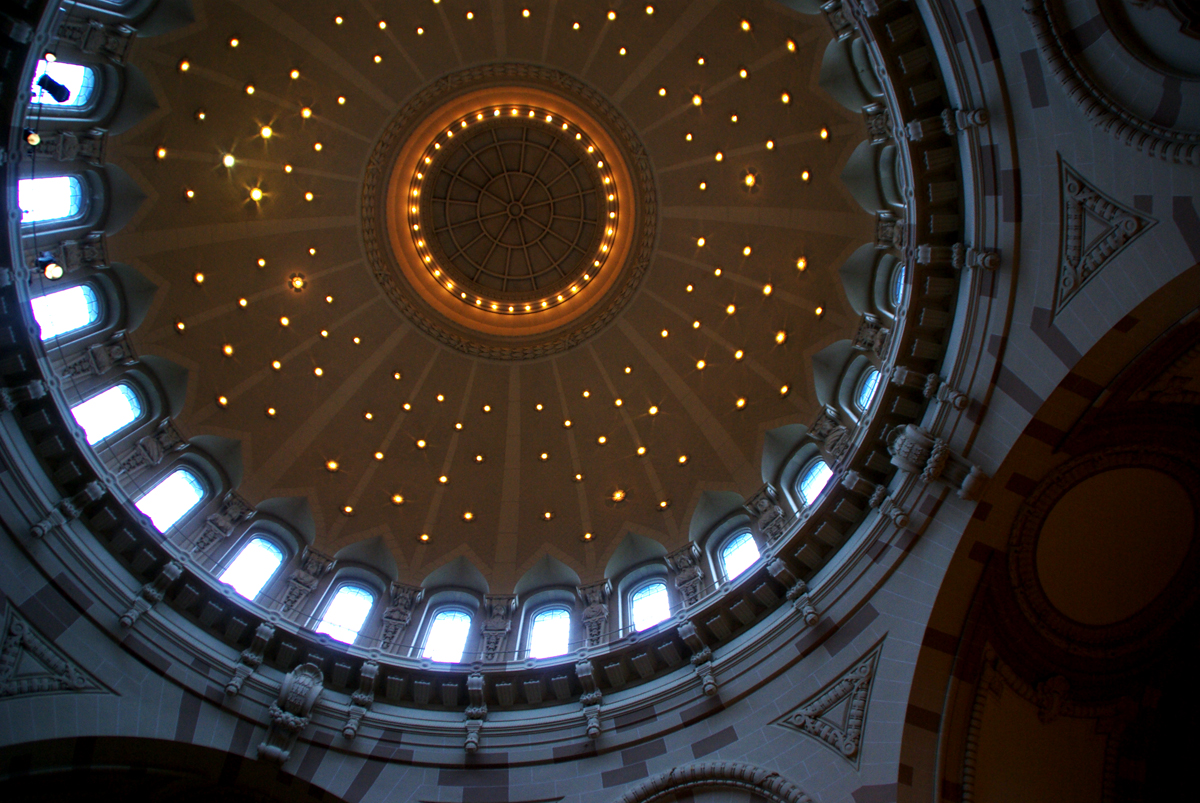
The ceiling of the chapel.

The United States Naval Academy Chapel in Annapolis, Maryland, is one of nine designated chapel spaces on the grounds of the United States Navy's service academy. Protestant and Catholic services are held there. The Brigade Chapel is a focal point of the Academy and the city of Annapolis. The chapel is an important feature which led to the Academy being designated a National Historic Landmark in 1961.

Traditionally, new third-class midshipmen become "Youngsters" when they sight the chapel dome upon returning from their summer cruise.

== History ==
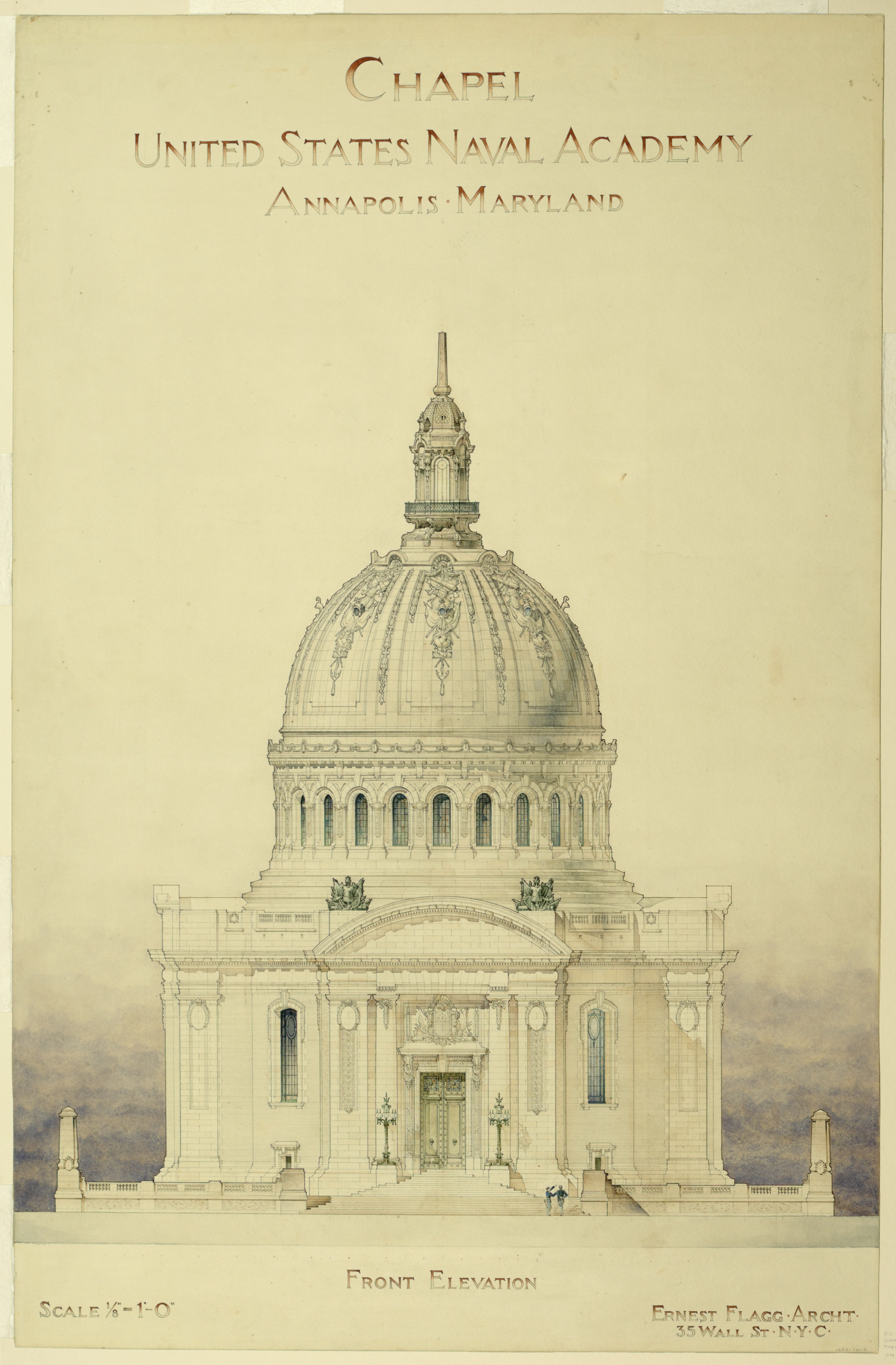
Watercolour rendering of the Chapel

The Brigade Chapel was designed by Ernest Flagg. The cornerstone was laid in 1904 by Admiral George Dewey and the dedication of the Chapel was on May 28, 1908.

In 1940, the Chapel underwent remodeling which doubled the seating capacity to 2,500, to accommodate a larger brigade of midshipmen. From 1853 to 1972, chapel attendance was compulsory. After remodeling, the chapel formed a large cross. The dome over the chapel is copper and the cupola is 193 feet (59 m) above the main altar area.

In 1995, the Chapel was featured on a U.S. Postal Service postage stamp, honoring the Academy's 150th anniversary.

In 2009, nearly seventy years after the 1940 renovation and expansion, the chapel underwent an extensive restoration that included the repair of decades-long deterioration. The restoration uncovered the dome's 20 feet (6.1 m)-diameter oculus (round skylight), situated 121 feet (37 m) above the chapel floor, which had been plastered over for decades because of its deteriorating condition. The cost of the project was nearly $2.5 million, of which $925,000 was donated by the Class of 1969 to cover the cost of replacing the hardwood floors and refinishing the pews. The remaining $2.3 million came from the government.

== Architectural features ==
The two stained-glass windows facing the altar are symbolic. One is of Sir Galahad holding his sheathed sword, portraying the ideals of the naval service. The other signifies the Commission Invisible, a beacon each new officer must follow: Christ is pointing him toward the flag. Four other windows are memorials to LCDR Theodorus B.M. Mason and Admirals David Dixon Porter, David Farragut, and William T. Sampson. Several of the stained-glass windows in the Chapel were designed by Frederick Wilson.

The Brigade Chapel boasts a 268-rank organ controlled by one of the largest drawknob consoles in the world (522 drawknobs).

The basement level of the chapel houses the crypt of John Paul Jones and St. Andrew's Chapel which is used for smaller services.

== John Paul Jones Crypt ==
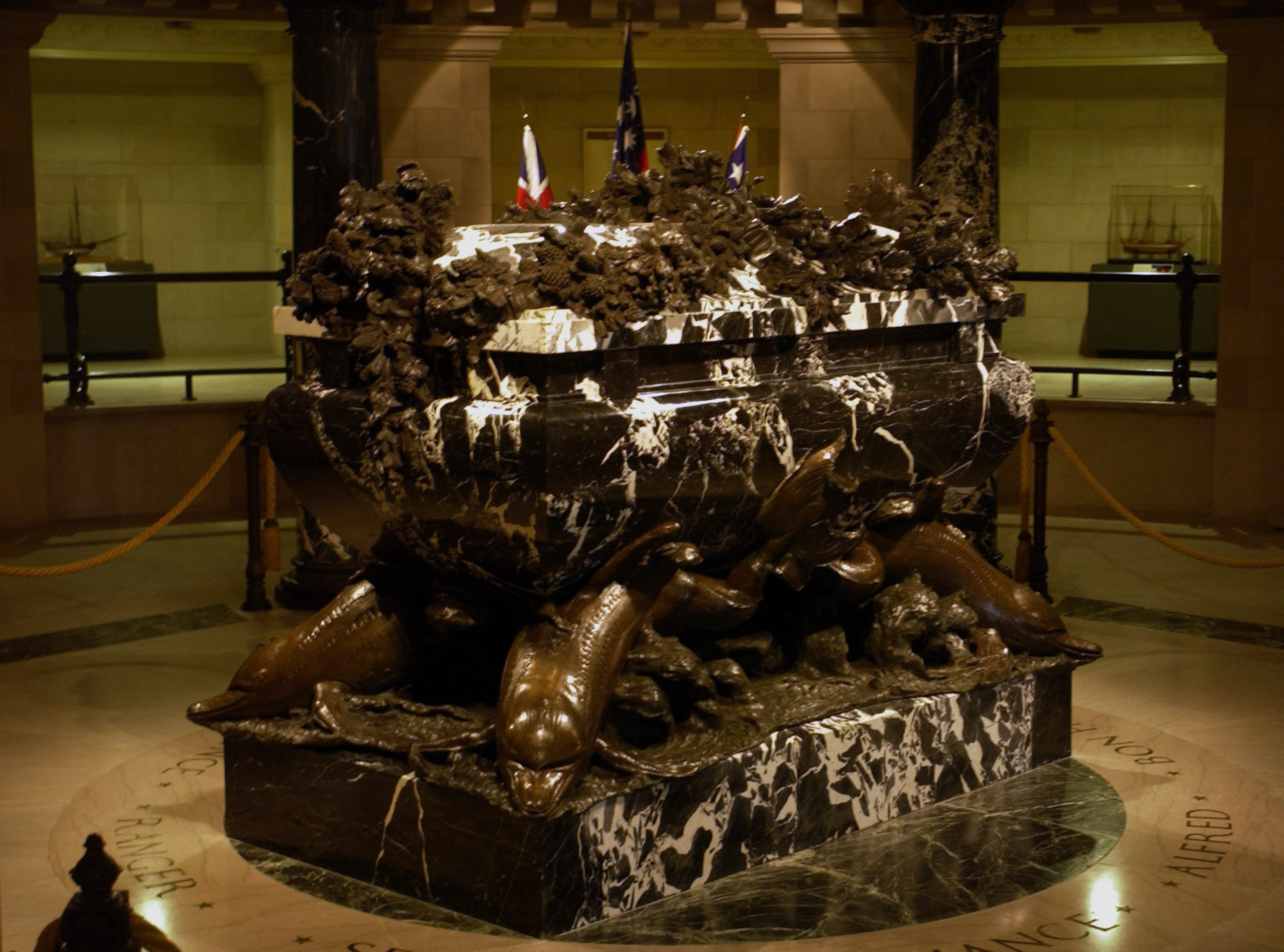
The sarcophagus of John Paul Jones.

On January 26, 1913, the remains of John Paul Jones were interred in the crypt beneath the Brigade Chapel, inside a sarcophagus made of 21 short tons (19 t) of black and white Italian marble with bronze fittings.

In the deck around the crypt are inscribed the names of his ships: Bonhomme Richard, Alliance, Serapis, Ariel, Alfred, Providence, and Ranger.

== See also ==
- Commodore Uriah P. Levy Center and Jewish Chapel (USNA)
- United States Navy Chaplain Corps
- United States Air Force Academy Cadet Chapel (including Catholic, Jewish, and Protestant chapels)
- United States Military Academy Chapel (Protestant)
- Chapel of the Most Holy Trinity (West Point) (Catholic)
- United States Merchant Marine Academy#Mariners' Memorial Chapel
- St. Peter's Chapel, Mare Island (Catholic and Protestant)

== Footnotes ==
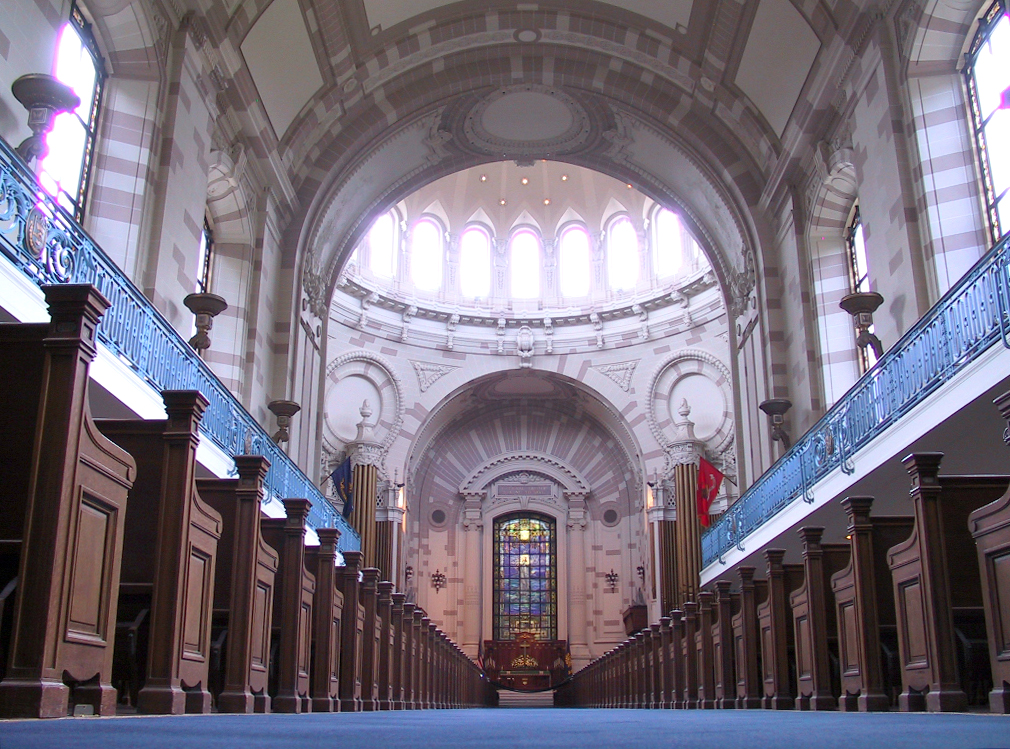
Interior of the Brigade of Midshipmen Chapel
