= United States Air Force Academy Cadet Chapel =

Chapel in Colorado, US

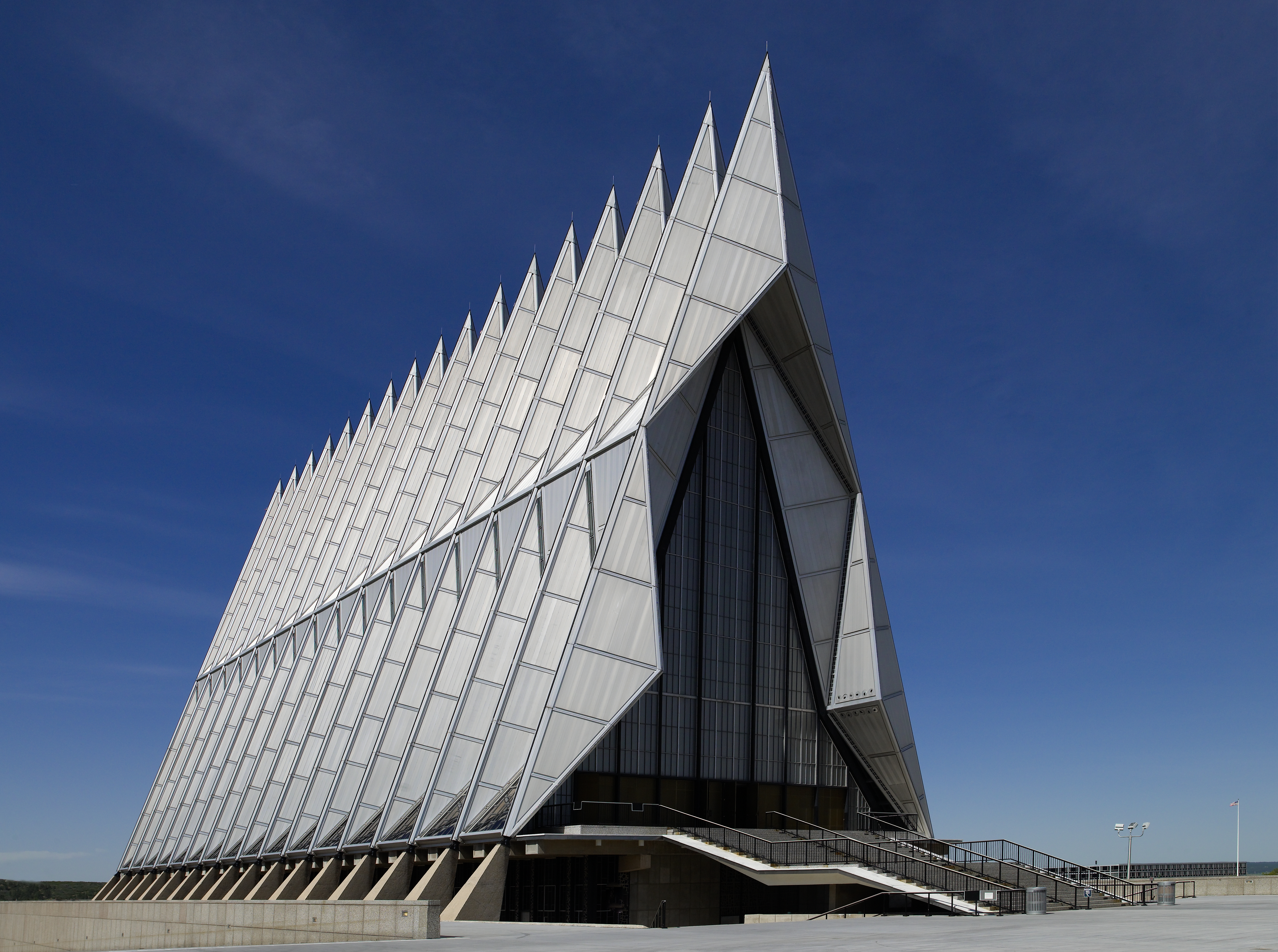
- The chapel in 2019
- Interactive map of the United States Air Force Academy Cadet Chapel area

General information
- Type: Chapel
- Architectural style: Mid-century modern
- Location: U.S. Air Force Academy, near Colorado Springs, CO
- Coordinates: 39°00′30″N 104°53′25″W
- Construction started: 1959
- Completed: 1962

Height
- Height: 150 feet (46 m)

Technical details
- Structural system: Folded plates
- Floor count: 2 floors

Design and construction
- Architects: Walter Netsch Jr., Skidmore, Owings and Merrill
- Main contractor: Robert E. McKee, Inc.
- Awards: AIA National Twenty-five Year Award; U.S. National Historic Landmark, 2004
- United States Air Force Academy Cadet Chapel
- U.S. Historic district – Contributing property
- Location within Colorado Location within the United States
- Location: United States Air Force Academy
- Built: 1962
- Architectural style: Modern Movement
- Part of: United States Air Force Academy, Cadet Area (ID04000484)
- Designated CP: April 1, 2004

The United States Air Force Academy Cadet Chapel, completed in 1962, is the distinguishing feature of the Cadet Area at the United States Air Force Academy north of Colorado Springs, Colorado, United States. It was designed by Walter Netsch of Skidmore, Owings and Merrill of Chicago. Construction was accomplished by Robert E. McKee, Inc., of Santa Fe, New Mexico. Originally controversial in its design, the Cadet Chapel has become a classic and highly regarded example of modernist architecture. The Cadet Chapel was awarded the American Institute of Architects' National Twenty-five Year Award in 1996 and, as part of the Cadet Area, was named a U.S. National Historic Landmark in 2004.

== Architecture and construction ==
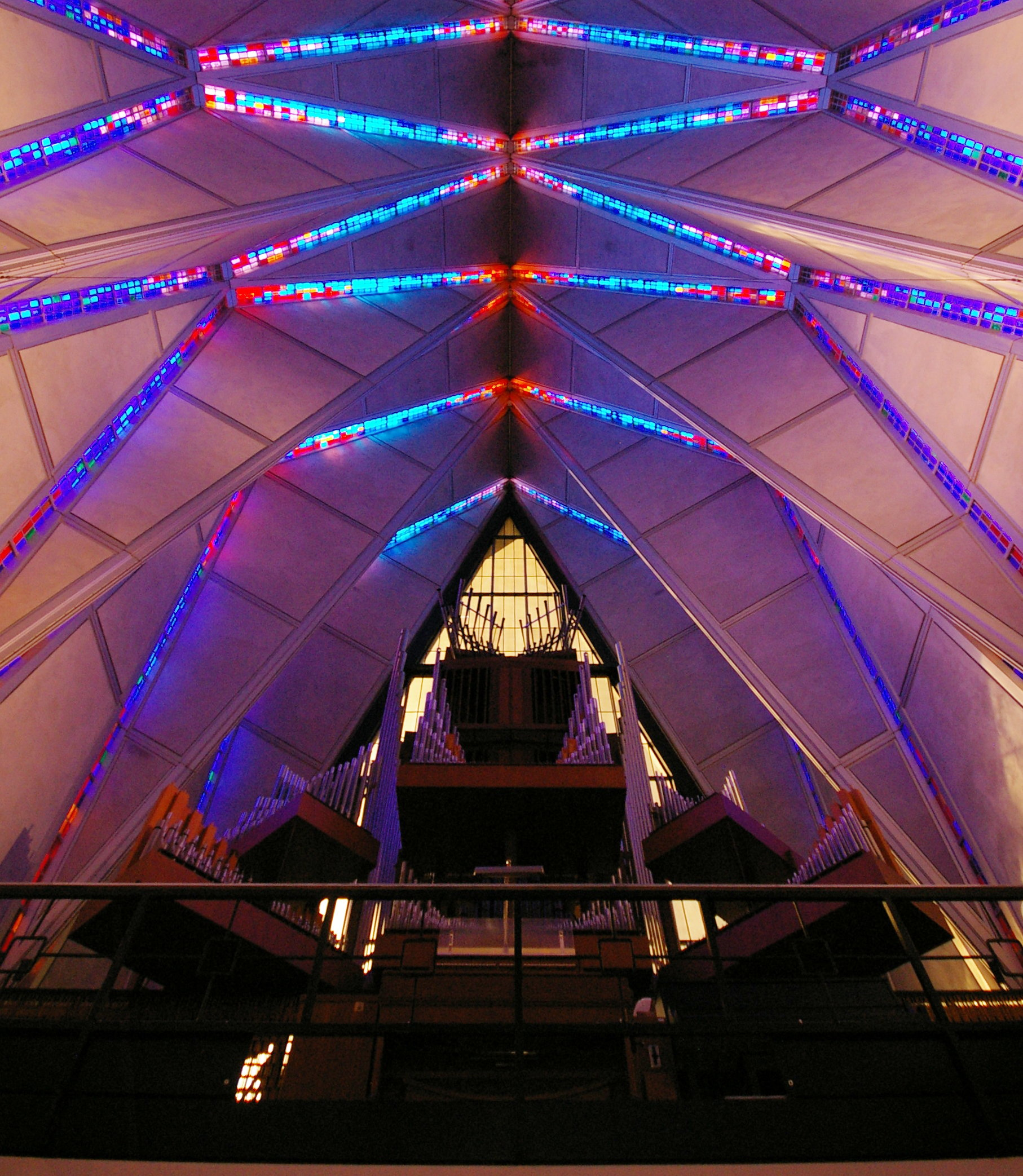
The organ at the back of the Protestant chapel, and the ceiling

The most striking aspect of the chapel is its row of seventeen spires. The original design called for twenty-one spires, but this number was reduced due to budget issues. The structure is a tubular steel frame of 100 identical tetrahedrons, each 75 feet (23 m) long, weighing five tons, and enclosed with aluminum panels. The panels were fabricated in Missouri and shipped by rail to the site. The tetrahedrons are spaced a foot apart, creating gaps in the framework that are filled with 1-inch-thick (25 mm) colored glass. The tetrahedrons comprising the spires are filled by triangular aluminum panels, while the tetrahedrons between the spires are filled with a mosaic of colored glass in aluminum frame.

The Cadet Chapel itself is 150 feet (46 m) high, 280 feet (85 m) long, and 84 feet (26 m) wide. The front façade, on the south, has a wide granite stairway with steel railings capped by aluminum handrails leading up one story to a landing. At the landing is a band of gold anodized aluminum doors, flanked by gold anodized aluminum panels, designed and detailed to match the doors.

The shell of the chapel and surrounding grounds cost $3.5 million to build. Various furnishings, pipe organs, liturgical fittings and adornments of the chapel were presented as gifts from various individuals and organizations. In 1959, a designated Easter offering was also taken at Air Force bases around the world to help complete the interior.

=== Major renovation ===
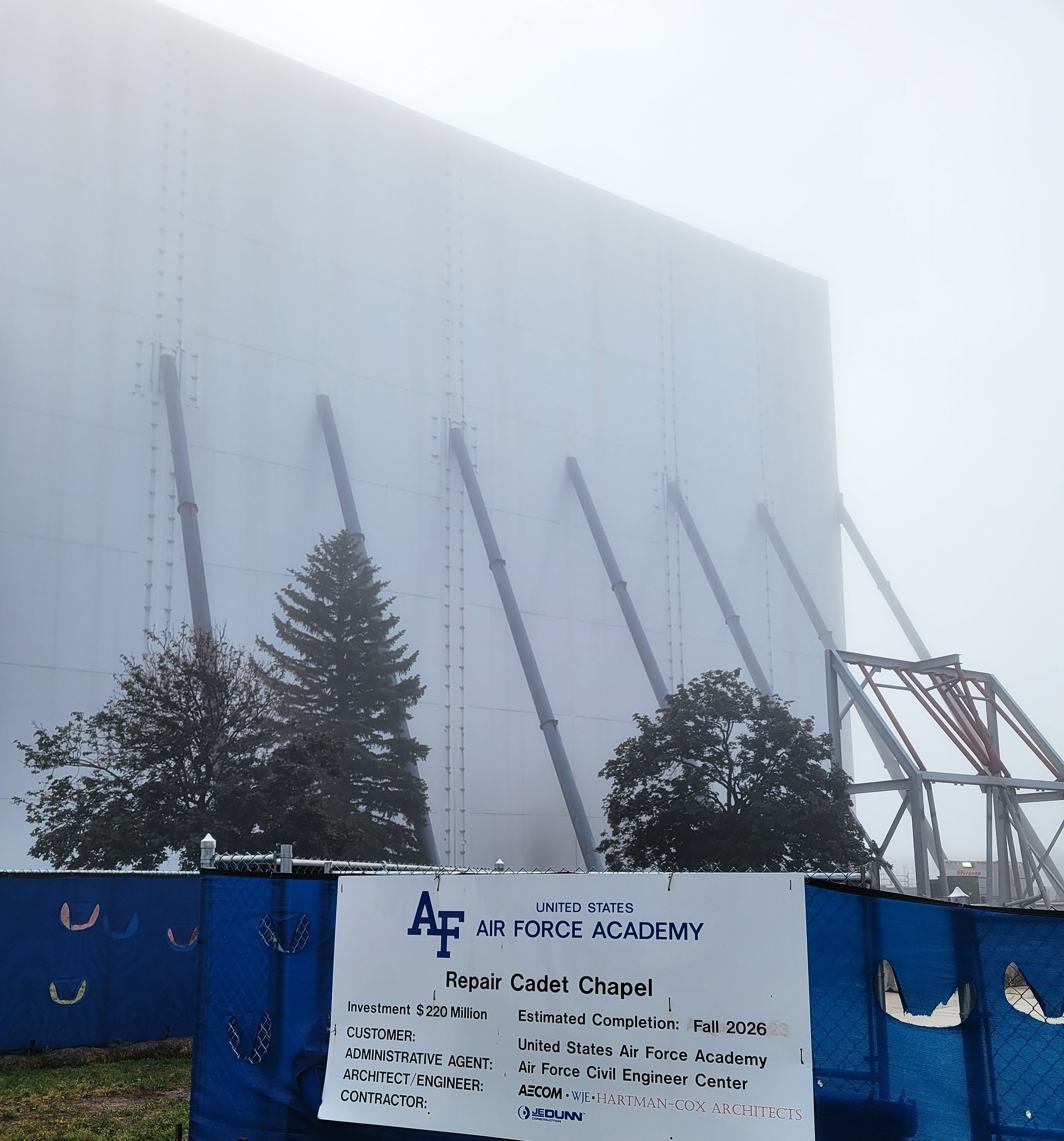
Temporary "hangar" built over the existing structure, September 11, 2022

The chapel closed in September 2019 for a $158 million renovation and restoration project needed to address water damage. Netsch's original plans included a series of rain gutters underneath the aluminum exterior of the chapel's spires, but these were not built due to budget constraints. The seams between the panels were caulked instead. Though the seams were repeatedly re-caulked over the years, decades of leaks left extensive water damage to the main floor and its fixtures. During the renovation, an enormous temporary "hangar", or as cadets call it- "The Box", was built over the existing structure to allow workers to remove the aluminum panels and stained glass blocks and install the originally-designed rain gutters. The chapel's furniture and pipe organs are also being cleaned and repaired. The project was originally scheduled to be completed by November 2022. In November 2021, the academy's campus architect, Duane Boyle, said that the project will miss its original completion date, after construction crews discovered more asbestos inside the chapel's structure than expected, requiring additional time for remediation. Renovations are presently scheduled to be completed in May 2028 according to updated signage posted at the construction site.

== Worship areas ==
The Cadet Chapel was designed specifically to house three distinct worship areas under a single roof. Inspired by chapels at Sainte-Chapelle in France and the Basilica of San Francesco d'Assisi in Italy, architect Walter Netsch stacked the spaces on two main levels. The Protestant nave is located on the upper level, while the Catholic and Jewish chapels and a Buddhist room are located beneath it. Beneath this level is a larger room used for Islamic services and two meeting rooms. Each chapel has its own entrance, and services may be held simultaneously without interfering with one another.

=== Protestant chapel ===
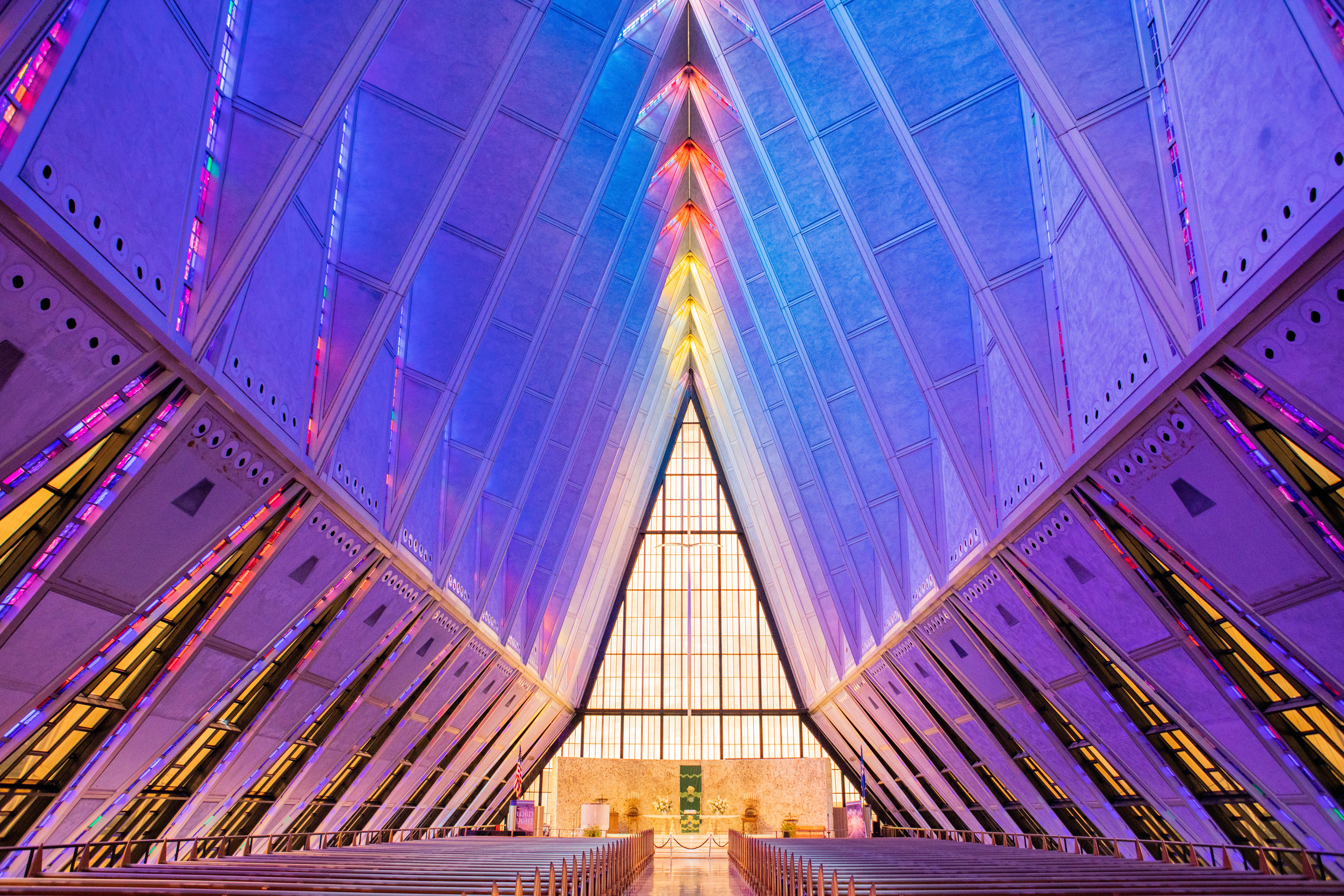
Interior of the Protestant chapel

The Protestant chapel is located on the main floor, and is designed to seat 1,200 individuals. The nave measures 64 feet (20 m) by 168 feet (51 m), reaching up to 94 feet (29 m) at the highest peak. The center aisle terminates at the chancel.

The building's tetrahedrons form the walls and the pinnacled ceiling of the Protestant chapel. Stained glass windows provide ribbons of color between the tetrahedrons, and progress from darker to lighter as they reach the altar. The chancel is set off by a crescent-shaped, varicolored reredos with semi-precious stones from Colorado and pietra santa marble from Italy covering its 1,260-square-foot (117 m^{2}) area. The focal point of the chancel is a 46-foot (14 m) high aluminum cross suspended above it. The pews are made of American walnut and African mahogany with the ends sculpted to resemble World War I airplane propellers. The backs of the pews are capped by a strip of aluminum similar to the trailing edge of a fighter aircraft wing.

Above the narthex, in the rear, is a choir loft and organ, designed by Walter Holtkamp of the Holtkamp Organ Company, and built by M. P. Moller of Hagerstown, Maryland. The organ, Moller Opus 9480, has 83 ranks and 67 stops controlling 4,334 pipes. Harold E. Wagoner designed the liturgical furnishings for both the Protestant and Catholic chapels.

=== Catholic chapel ===
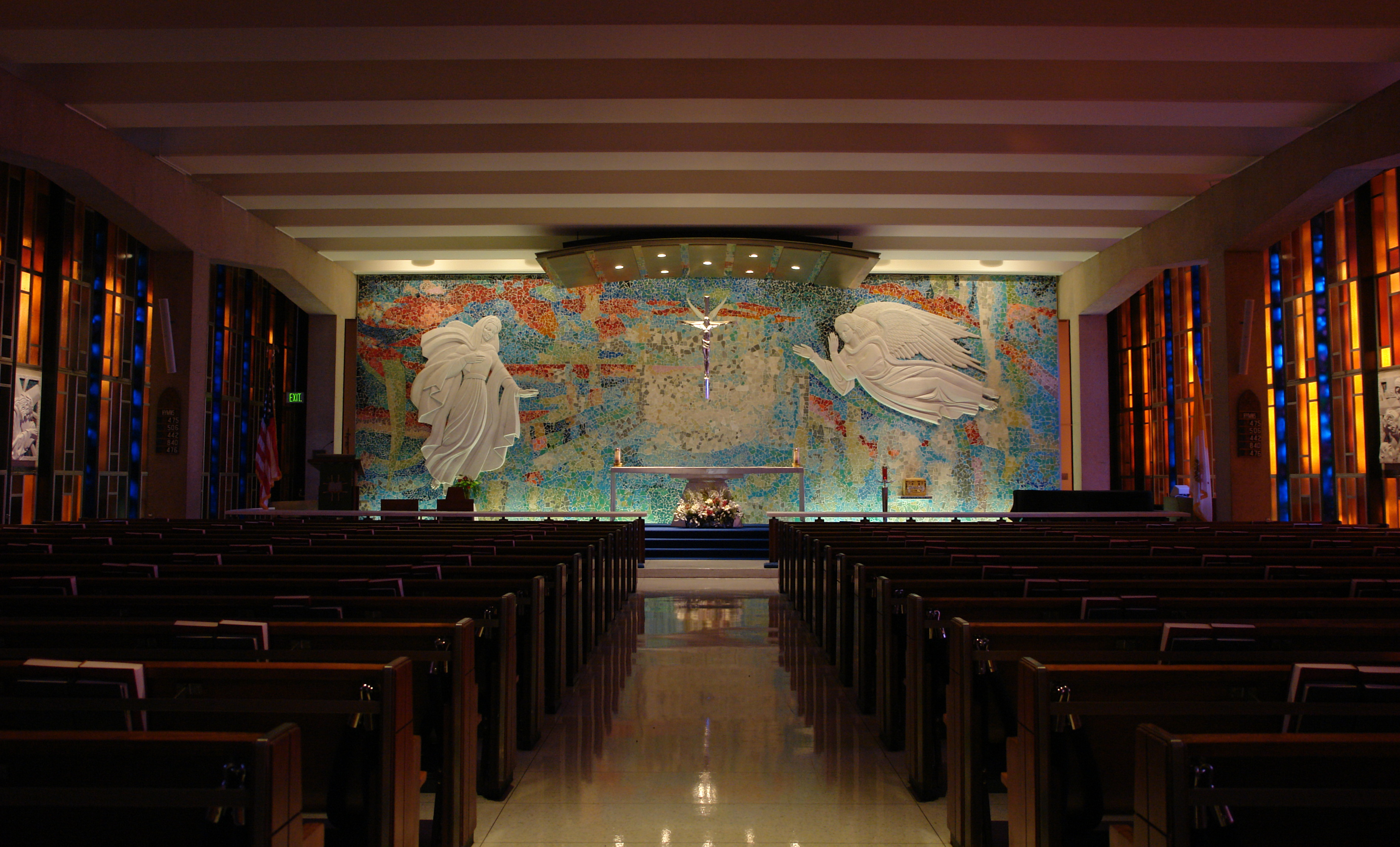
Interior of the Catholic chapel

The Catholic chapel is located below the Protestant chapel, and seats approximately 500 people. The nave is 56 feet (17 m) wide, 113 feet (34 m) long and 19 feet (5.8 m) high. The focal point of the Catholic chapel is the reredos, an abstract glass mosaic mural designed by Lumen Martin Winter and composed of varying shades of blue, turquoise, rose and gray tessera to form a portrayal of the firmament. Superimposed on the mural and depicting the Annunciation are two 10-foot (3.0 m) tall marble figures, the Virgin Mary on the left, and the Archangel Gabriel on the right. Above and between these two figures is a marble dove.

In front of the reredos is the altar, a gift from Cardinal Francis Spellman, who dedicated the Catholic chapel on September 22, 1963. The altar is Italian white marble mounted on a marble cone-shaped pedestal above which is a six-foot sculptured nickel-silver crucifix. Along the side walls of the chapel are the 14 Stations of the Cross, also designed by Lumen Martin Winter, and carved from four-inch (102 mm) thick slabs of marble. The figures are done in Carrara marble, from the same quarries where Michelangelo drew his stone. The classical pipe organ, in the 100-seat choir loft, was designed by Walter Holtkamp and built by M. P. Moller Co. It is Moller Opus 9481 and features 36 ranks and 29 stops controlling its 1,914 pipes.

=== Jewish chapel ===
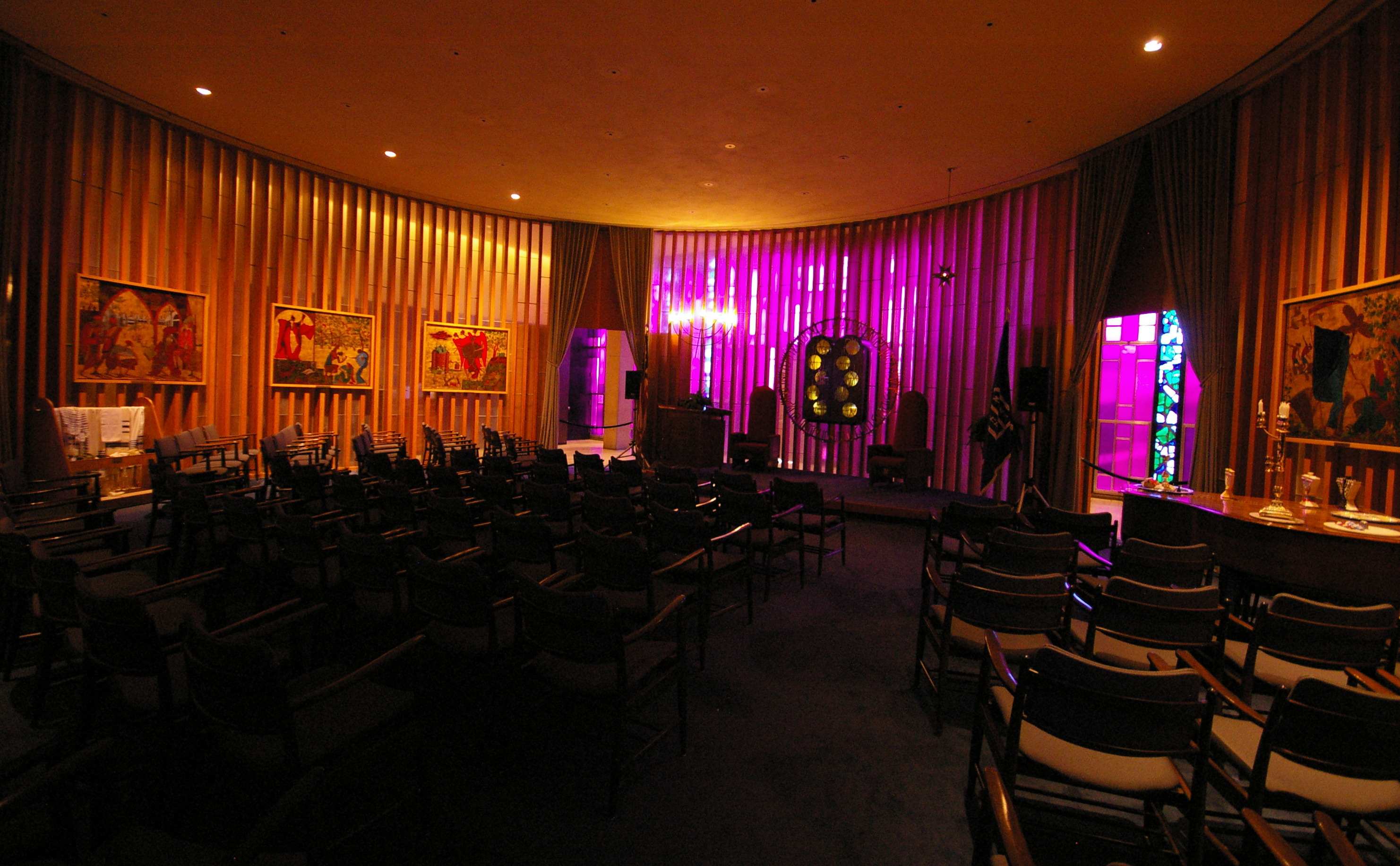
Interior of the Jewish chapel

The Jewish chapel is also on the lower level. Seating 100, it is circular, with a diameter of 42 feet (13 m) and a height of 19 feet (5.8 m). It is enclosed by a vertical grill with inserts of clear glass opening to the foyer. The circular form and transparent walls were used to suggest a tent-like structure. The floor is paved with Jerusalem brownstone, donated by the Israel Defense Forces.

The walls of the foyer are purple stained glass panels alternating with green and blue stained accent windows. The circular walls of the synagogue are panels of translucent glass separated by stanchions of Israeli cypress. The paintings, done by Shlomo Katz in 1985 and 1986, depict a Biblical story. They are divided into three groups; brotherhood, flight (in honor of the Air Force) and justice.

The focal point of the Jewish chapel is the Aron Kodesh, which shelters the Scrolls of the Torah, to the right of which hangs the Ner Tamid. In the foyer of the chapel is a display cabinet with a Torah Scroll that was saved from the Nazis during World War II. It was found in Poland in 1989 in an abandoned warehouse and donated to the Jewish chapel in April 1990. This "Holocaust Torah" is dedicated to the memory of all of those who fought against the Nazis.

=== Muslim chapel ===
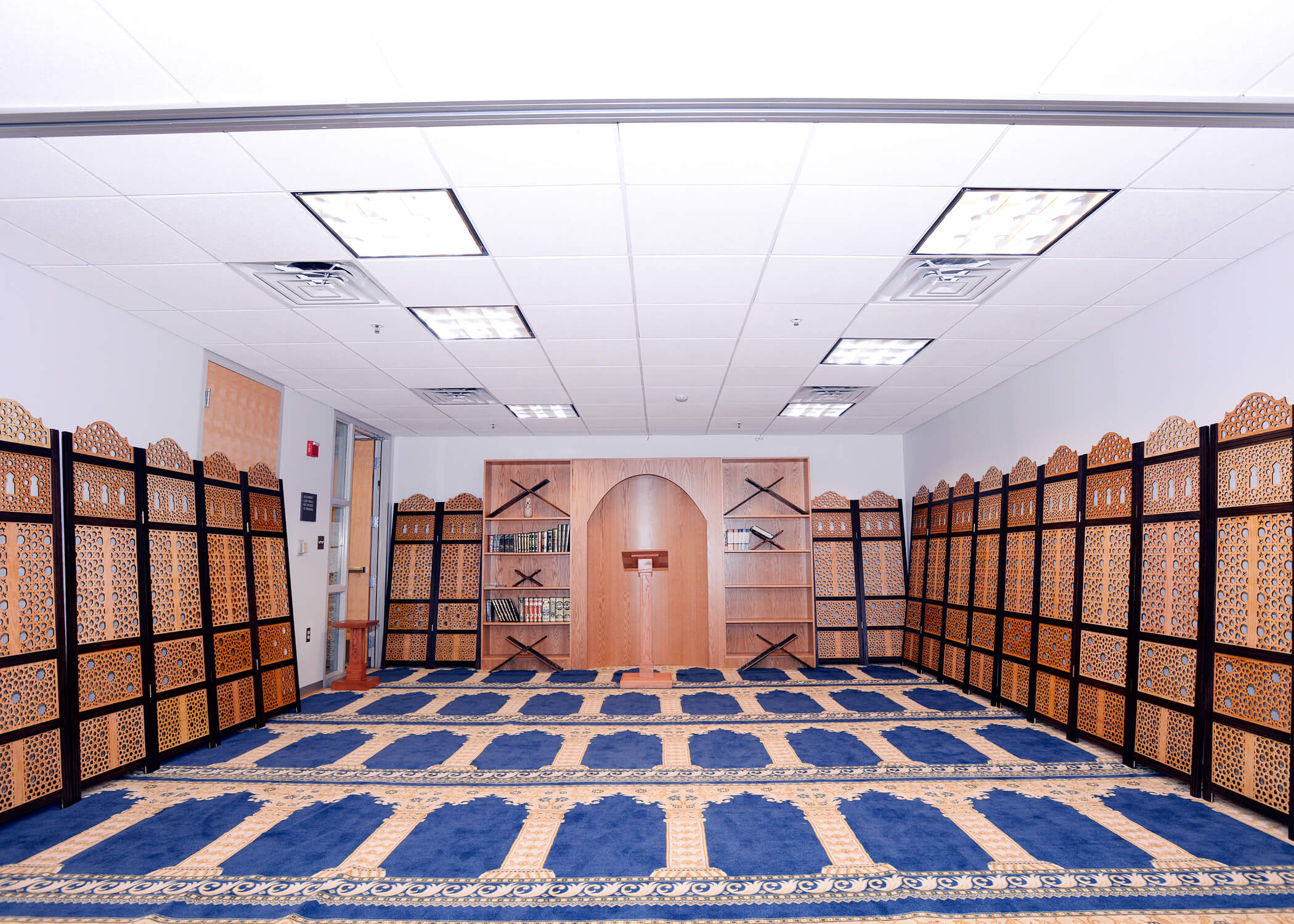
Interior of the Muslim chapel

The Muslim chapel is located on the lower level. It welcomes Muslims of all denominations. The mihrab is made of wood filled with the Quran and other Muslim books. Surrounded by Middle Eastern wooden art on its walls and the floor is blue and yellow with Middle Eastern designs.

=== Buddhist chapel ===
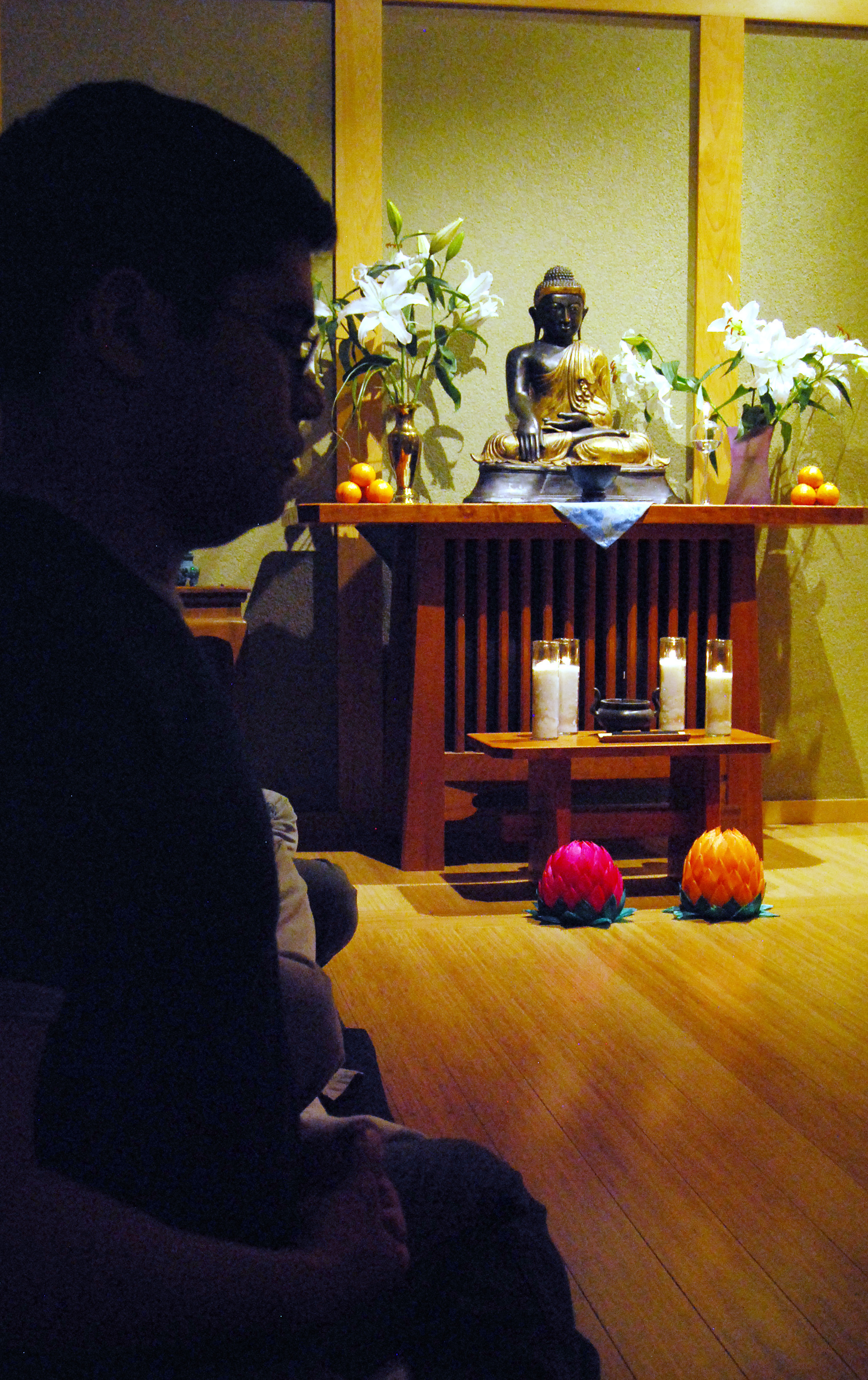
Interior of the Buddhist chapel

The Buddhist chapel is a freestanding hall within the Cadet Chapel, donated in 2007. It measures 300 square feet and welcomes Buddhists of all denominations. The altar has a Burmese statue of the Buddha and near the entry is a figure of Avalokiteśvara.

=== Falcon Circle ===
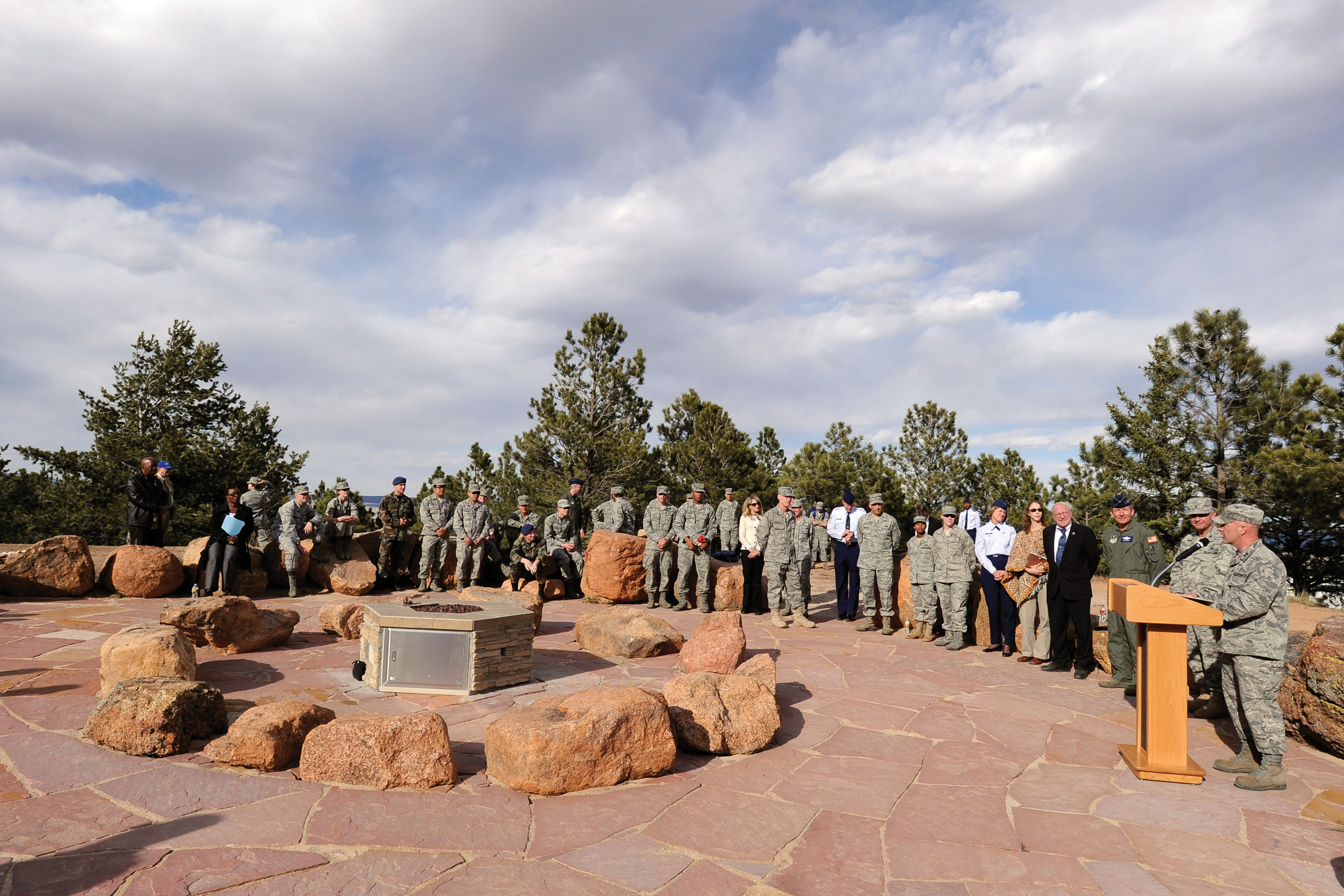
Dedication, 6 May 2011

The Falcon Circle is the newest of the Cadet Chapel's worship areas, dedicated in 2011. It was established through a request from followers of Earth-Centered Spirituality, an umbrella of traditions that includes Wicca, Paganism and Druidism. It is open to use by all religious communities to worship in a manner respectful of other faiths.

=== All-faiths rooms ===
The All-Faiths Rooms are worship areas for smaller religious groups. They are purposely devoid of religious symbolism so that they may be used by a variety of faiths. Distinguishing faith-specific accoutrements are available for each group to use during their worship services.

== See also ==
- United States Air Force Chaplain Corps
- United States Military Academy Chapel (Protestant)
- Chapel of the Most Holy Trinity (West Point) (Catholic)
- United States Naval Academy Chapel
- Commodore Uriah P. Levy Center and Jewish Chapel (U.S. Naval Academy)
- United States Merchant Marine Academy#Mariners' Memorial Chapel
