= M. P. Moller =

Danish-American pipe organ builder (1854–1937)

Mathias Peter Møller, commonly known as M.P. Möller or Moeller (29 September 1854 – 13 April 1937), was a Danish-American pipe organ builder and founder of the M.P. Möller Pipe Organ Company. Born on the Danish island of Bornholm, he emigrated to the United States in 1872 and founded his first workshop in Greencastle, Pennsylvania, in 1875. In 1881, civic leaders in Hagerstown, Maryland persuaded him to relocate the company to support the city's industrial growth. The firm became one of the largest pipe-organ manufacturers in the world, producing more than 12,000 instruments before going out of business in 1992.

== History ==
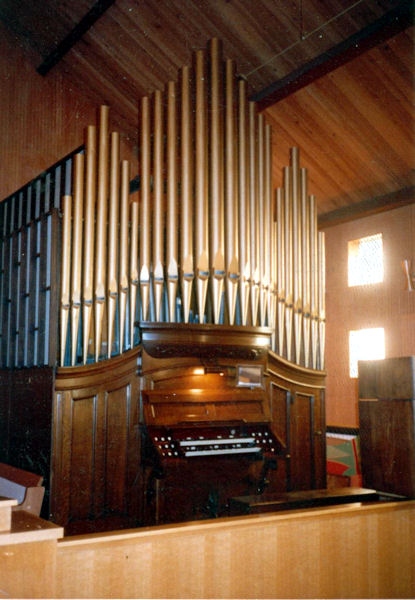
Opus 515 (1904): First Christian Church (Albany, Oregon)

Möller's earliest instruments were built by industry supply houses under contract, using tracker action to link the organ console to the pipe chests by mechanical means. By 1902 tubular-pneumatic action had been developed and was being used. By 1919 the company had developed its own version of electro-pneumatic action, referred to as pitman action. Möller thought that anybody who wanted a pipe organ should be able to get one. So, the company built many "Portable" (3 ranks of pipes) and "Artiste" instruments (3 to 9 ranks), smaller mass-produced organs which incorporated standard specifications with fewer sets of pipes. Möller organs can be found in churches, synagogues, concert halls, educational institutions, funeral homes, hospital chapels, movie theaters, municipal auditoriums, restaurants, private residences, and social service organizations.

The first major contract that Möller obtained with the United States service academies was for the instrument in the Cadet Chapel of the United States Military Academy at West Point, New York. This was Möller Opus 1200, dedicated in 1911. The project bid package included an approved organ design of three manuals with pedalboard. The winning bidder was allowed to suggest and implement changes to this design following the contract award. As a result, Möller, as the builder of the organ, got to demonstrate his best practices in the Cadet Chapel organ. Möller remained the primary supplier of additions until after World War II. Today this mostly-Möller organ is the world's largest all-pipe organ in a religious structure, although the First Congregational Church of Los Angeles, California makes a similar claim with its two pipe organs. Möller rebuilt and expanded the Naval Academy Chapel Organ in 1940, and built the organ for the Air Force Academy Chapel in 1963.

In 1944, M. P. Möller Inc. purchased and acquired the staff and assets of Louisville-based organ company Henry Pilcher's Sons, Inc.

During WW2, Möller built wooden wing spars for PT-19 aircraft manufactured by Fairchild Aircraft.

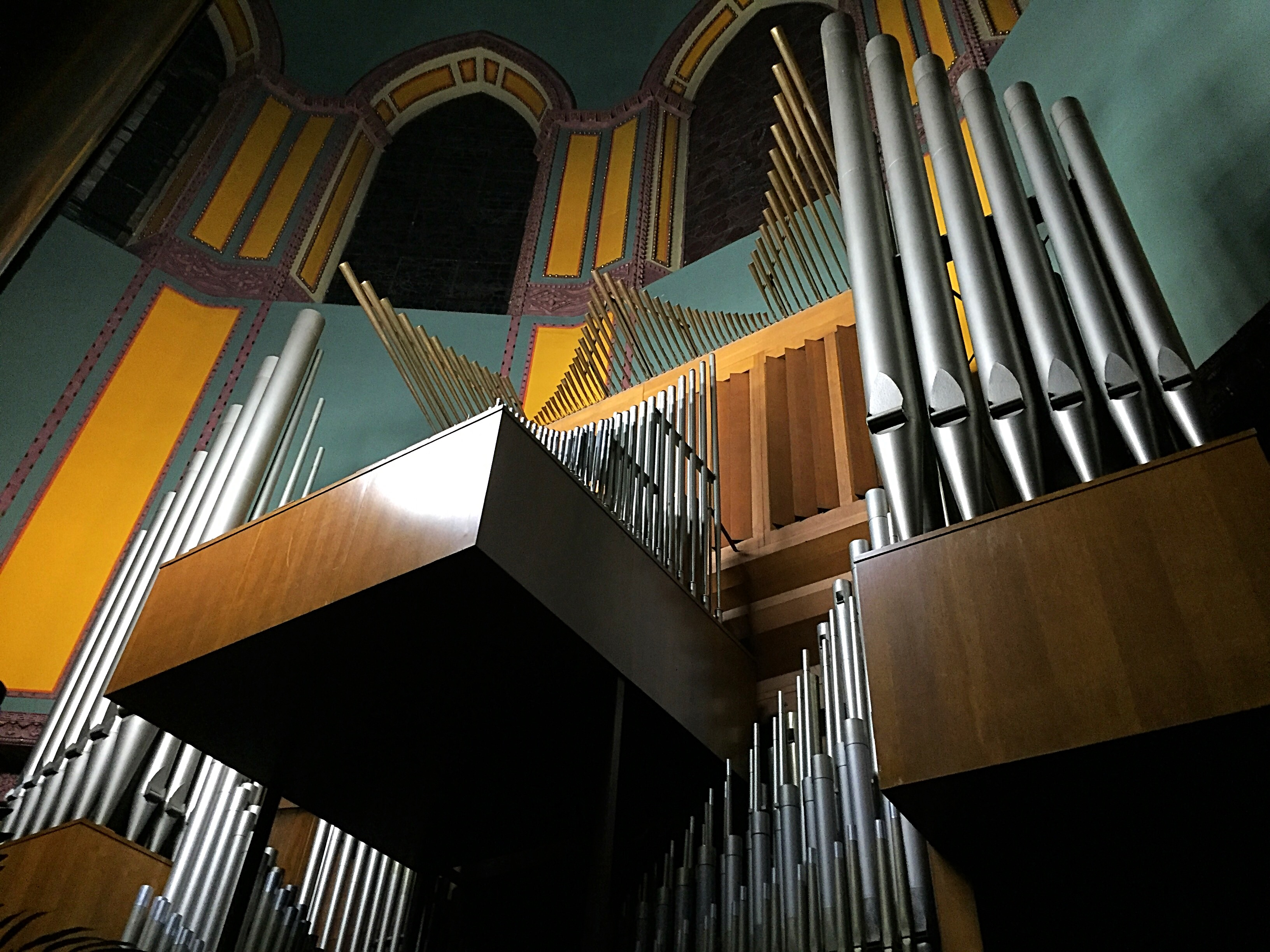
Opus 9987 (1965): Church of St. Paul the Apostle (New York City)

Prior to World War II, Möller had been a low-cost organ supplier. With the end of the war, Möller began to compete somewhat with Aeolian-Skinner for higher-end pipe organs, including the revision of the Skinner organ at Saint Thomas Church (Manhattan) in 1948, although some of Möller's success in this area was due to quicker delivery rather than tonal superiority. In 1950, Central Presbyterian Church (Manhattan) installed the Möller Opus 8000, a large four-manual, 79-rank instrument. Möller promoted the organ in trade journals and through special performances. The organ was featured during the 1956 American Guild of Organists National Convention. Another example of Möller's product is the pair of instruments dedicated in 1965 at the Basilica of the National Shrine of the Immaculate Conception in Washington, D.C. A three-manual organ was installed in the transept and a four-manual in the rear gallery. In the same year, Möller installed the large four-manual organ at St. Paul the Apostle Church in New York City. This instrument, in the church's famously reverberant acoustic, has been celebrated by generations of organists. Virgil Fox recorded The Christmas Album on the Möller at St. Paul the Apostle in 1965. 1966 saw the completion of another large organ in Buffalo, New York's Central Presbyterian Church.

The largest Möller church organ, built as a single new instrument, is installed in Calvary Church, Charlotte, North Carolina, Opus 11739, completed in 1990. Möller also built a large number of theatre organs, often known as the "Möller Deluxe" organ. The company's largest theatre instrument still resides in Atlanta's Fox Theatre, affectionately known as the "Mighty Mo" since 1929.

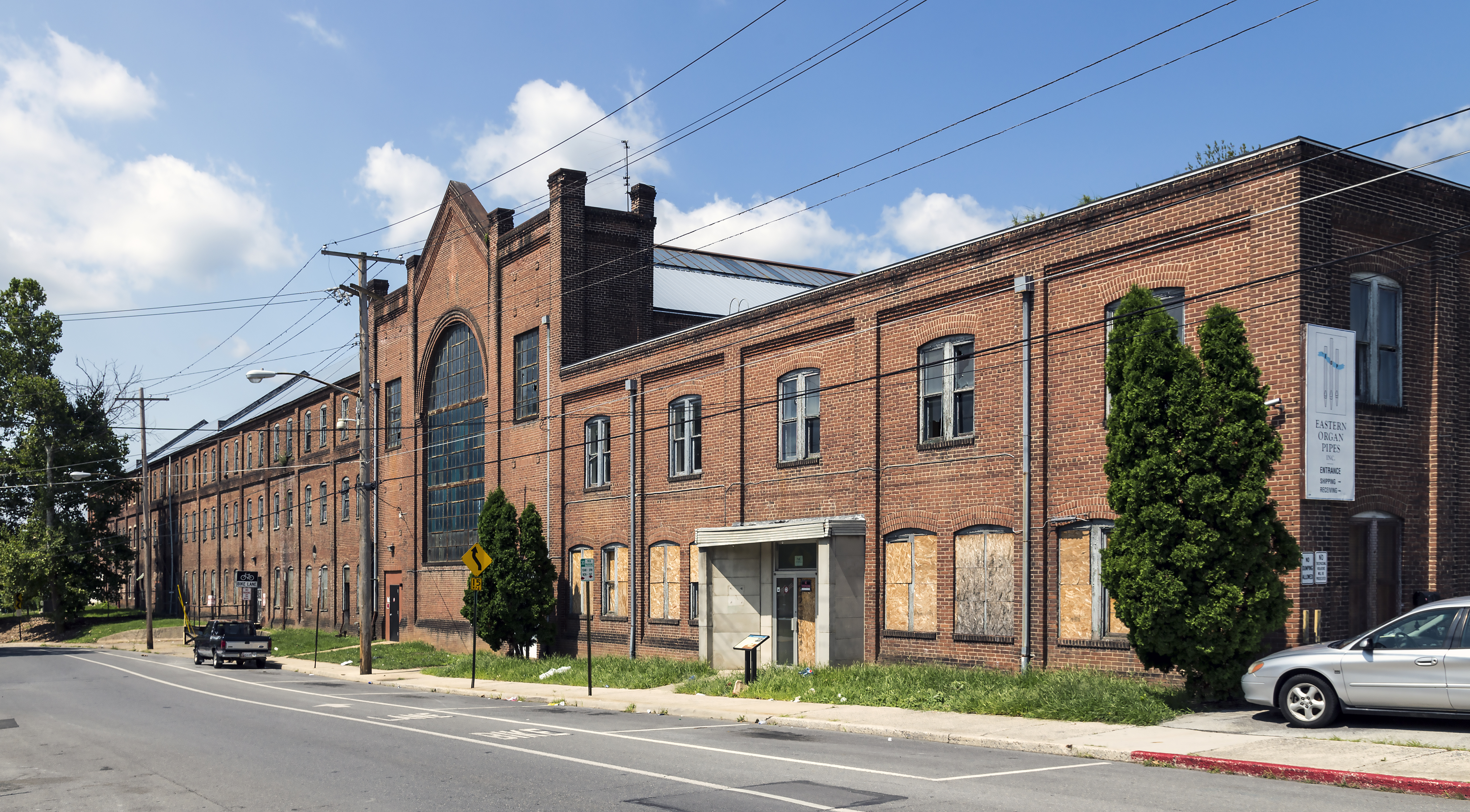
The abandoned Möller factory in Hagerstown, Maryland in 2014

Möller introduced solid-state console electronics and other modernizations in the 1980s, but rising labor costs, underinvestment in facilities, and increasing competition weakened the company. By early 1992, restructuring attempts had failed, the Möller family lost control, and the company halted production. Its final new organ was installed that year in the Chapel by the Sea in Fort Myers Beach, Florida. In 1993, the factory's assets—including consoles, pipes, lumber, and equipment—were auctioned after bankruptcy proceedings. Many churches lost deposits on organs that were never built.

The company name, archives, and customer list were acquired by King of Instruments, Inc., which briefly continued limited work under the name "Möller Organ Company". Operations ceased permanently soon afterward.

== See also ==
- List of pipe organs
