= Lumen Martin Winter =

American painter and sculptor

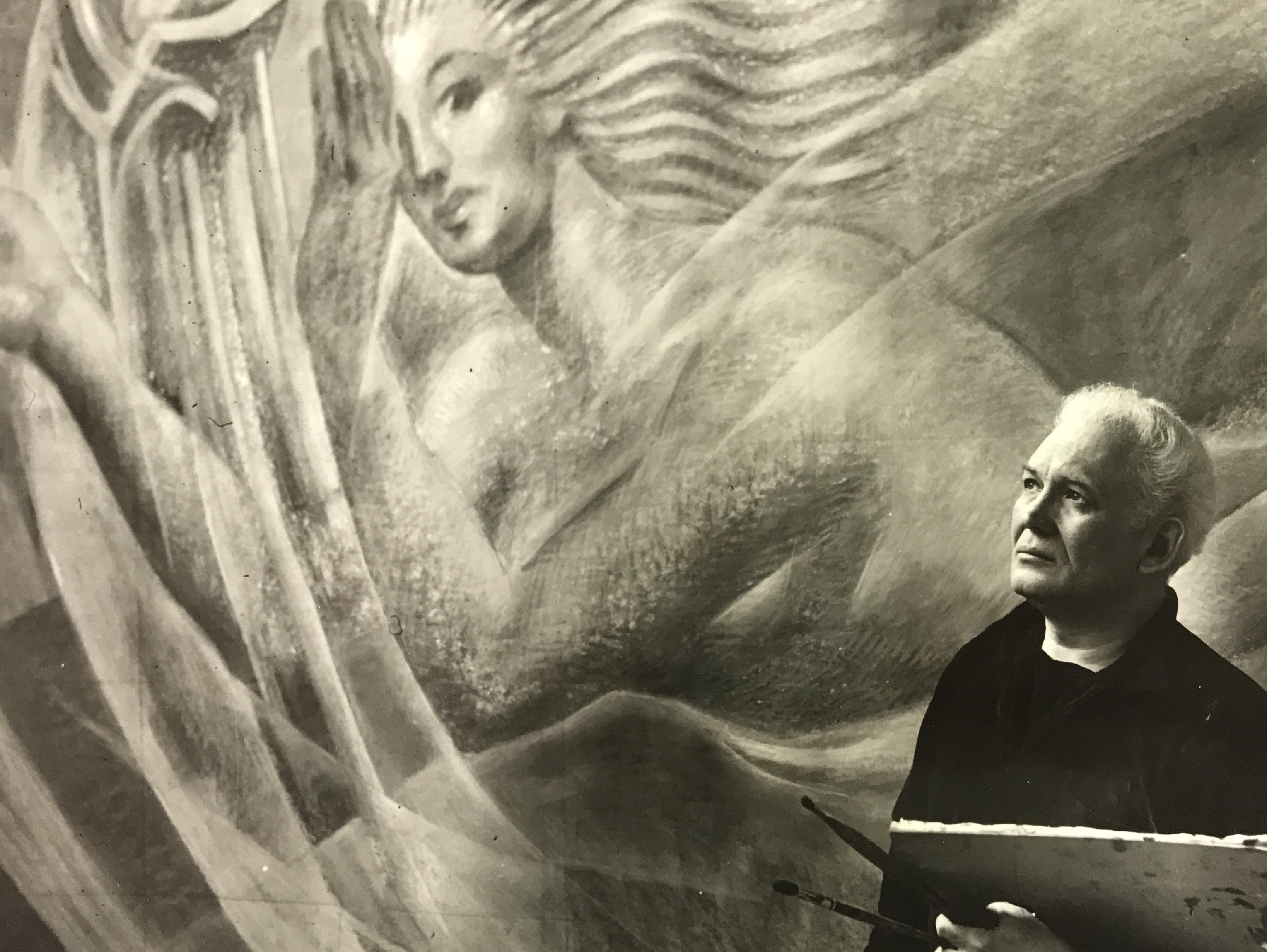
- Lumen Martin Winter in front of Venus of the Lake, 26-foot-wide mural in painter ceramic, Sheraton Chicago, 1961. The Long Island Museum.
- Born: Lumen Martin Winter; 12 December 1908; Ellery, Illinois
- Died: 5 April 1982; New Rochelle, New York
- Education: Cleveland School of Art, National Academy of Design, Grand Central School of Art
- Known for: Painting - Watercolor, Murals, Sculpture, Public Art
- Movement: Fusion of Classicism, Romanticism, Regionalism (art), Modernism

Lumen Martin Winter (December 12, 1908 – April 5, 1982) was an American public artist whose skills in sculpture, paintings, and works on paper, were widely known during his lifetime. His ability to master a wide range of media – including oil paint, watercolor, marble, and wood – helped Winter maintain his ideology of not reconciling to a single artistic approach. Winter successfully completed over 50 public art projects, with highlights including work at the AFL-CIO building in Washington, D.C., the United States Air Force Academy Cadet Chapel in Colorado Springs, Colorado, and the United Nations General Assembly Building in New York City. The Long Island Museum of American Art, History, and Carriages is the largest repository of Winter's work.

== Biography ==
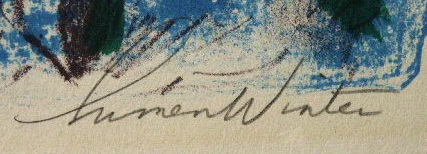
Photo of Lumen Martin Winter's signature from one of his prints

=== Early life ===
The youngest of three children, Lumen Martin Winter was born December 12, 1908, in Ellery, Illinois, to parents, William Grant Winter (1863-1945) and Blanche Nicholson Winter (1876-1909). His father was an engineer who designed farm equipment and wagons. Lumen's mother Blanche died when he was an infant. After Blanche's death, William Winter briefly put his children in an orphanage before moving the family to a ranch in Belpre, Kansas where he married Blanche's sister, Margaret. The ranch was located on the outskirts of the old Santa Fe Trail, where Winter observed seeing ruts in the ground from the countless early pioneer wagons that undertook the westward expansion journey in the 19th century. Just before entering high school in the early 1920s, Winter's family relocated to Grand Rapids, Michigan.

=== Education and early career ===
During his years at Union High School, Winter made a number of breakthroughs as a young artist. Some of his early work was published in The American Boy magazine and in the Grand Rapids Herald where he made $18 a week as a cartoonist and illustrator.

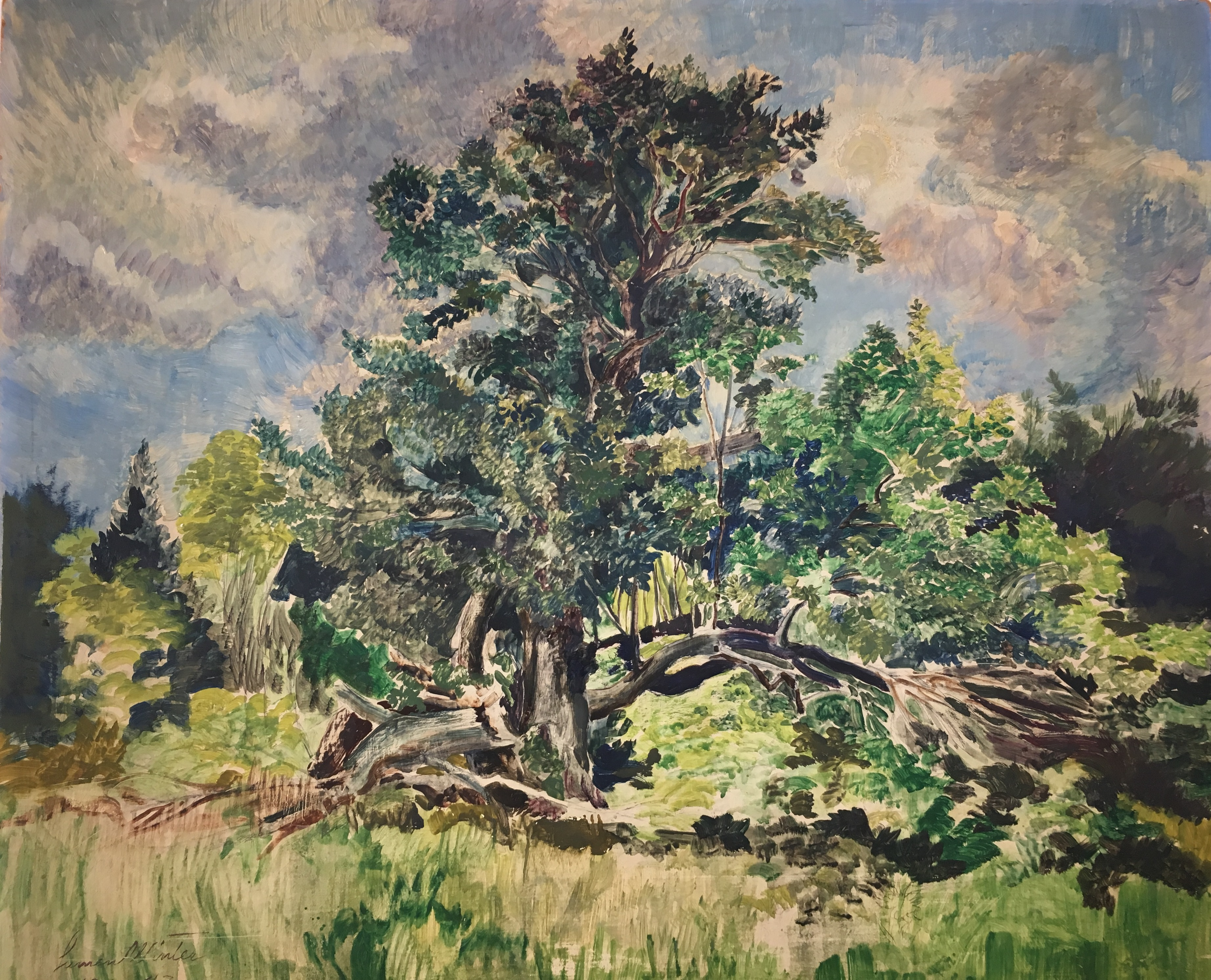
Aging Apple Tree, oil on Masonite, 1947. The Long Island Museum.

He created lobby posters at the Regent Theater and created art work for the Newspaper Engraving Company.

After graduating from high school, Winter continued to work at the newspaper while being enrolled as a student at Grand Rapids Junior College. Winter would later be accepted and begin training at the Cleveland School of Art in 1928. In February 1929, Winter decided to pursue better artistic and personal fortunes in New York City; there he studied at the National Academy of Design under Impressionist; Ivan G. Olinksy and at the Grand Central School of Art under Abstract Expressionist; Arshile Gorky. He also trained under prominent illustrator, Walter K. Biggs. His most significant training would be under the eminent muralist Ezra Winter (no relation). Working under the elder Winter, Lumen assisted on major commissions that included the large, dramatic Fountain of Youth mural overlooking the grand foyer at Radio City Music Hall and the murals inside George Rogers Clark National Historical Park in Vincennes, Indiana.

In the lean years of the Great Depression, Winter managed stints as an illustrator, including his work for Glenn Degner's book The Minute Epics of Flight (1932), a story of man's aspirations and achievements in flight over the millennia; several cover illustrations for Liberty magazine; and a poster for the United States Savings Bond program.

=== WPA Commissions ===
Some of his early projects were commissioned through President Roosevelt's New Deal initiative under the Works Progress Administration (WPA) during the 1930s and 40s. Under the WPA, Winter created post office murals in Fremont, Michigan; Hutchinson, Kansas; and St. Louis, Missouri.

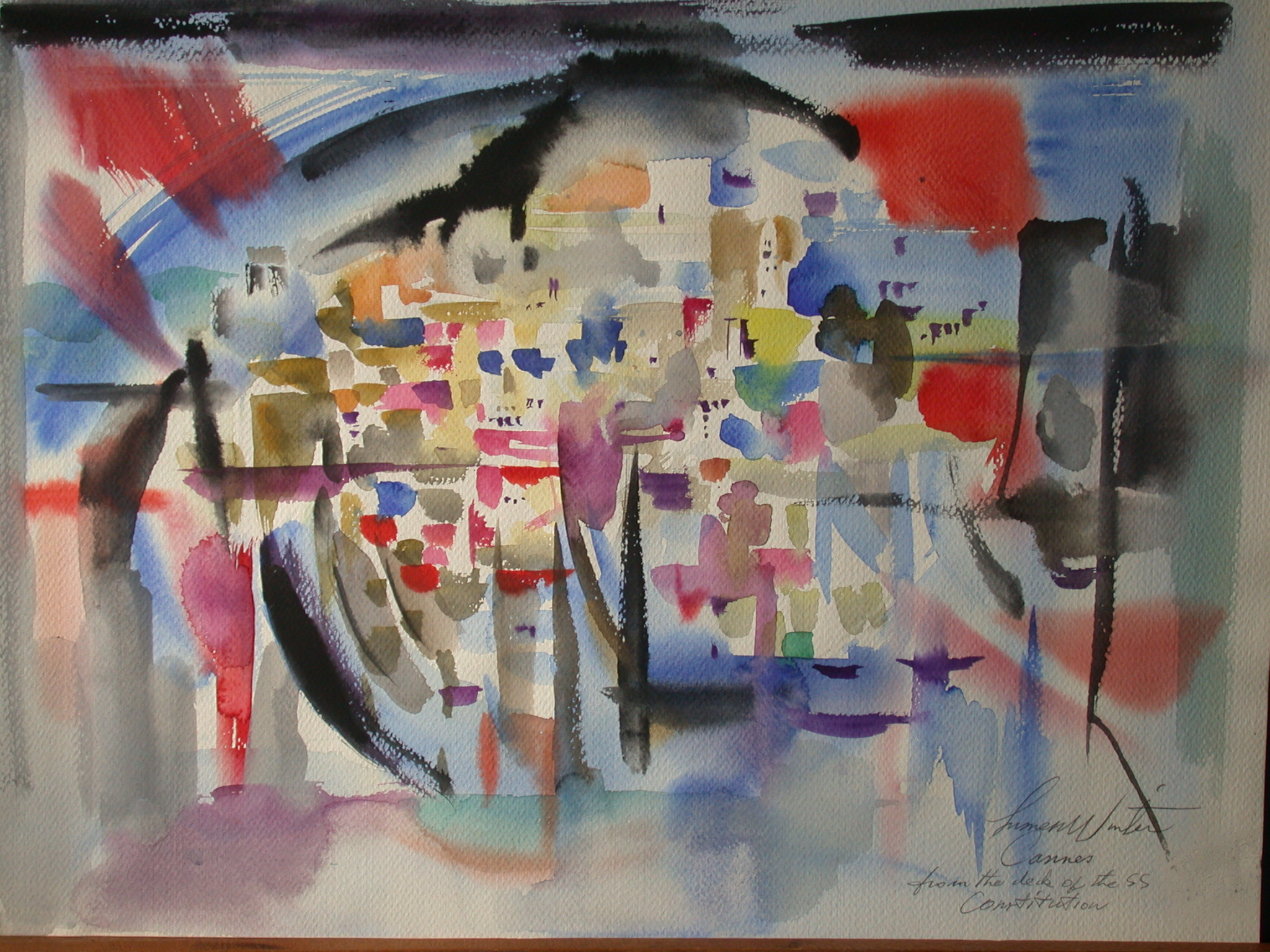
Cannes, from the deck of the SS Constitution, watercolor, 1955. The Long Island Museum Collection.

His mural created to decorate the historic Gwen B. Giles Station post office in St. Louis depicts the city's Old Levee and Market. The lively scene depicts a family trying to get out of the way of a stagecoach with unruly horses while two nearby men stand against a tree whose marker indicates Boone’ Lick Trail that ran west from St. Louis to Arrow Rock. As this mural indicates, WPA commissions were based on local history themes that provided readable guides to each state and sought to instill local pride amid the atmosphere of despair caused by the Great Depression.

== The West ==
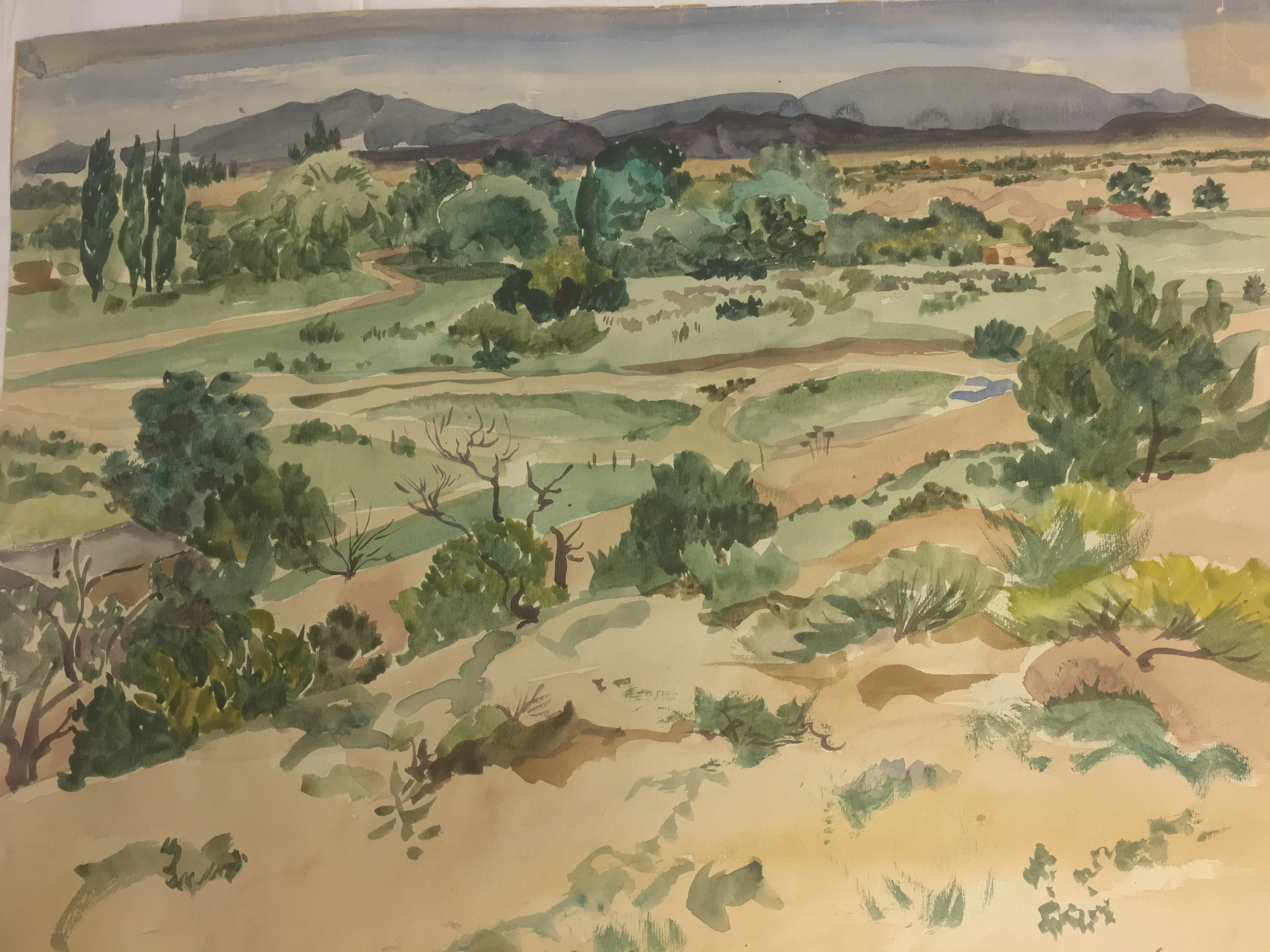
Untitled, New Mexico desert, watercolor, 1951. The Long Island Museum collection.

Winter's experiences living in the rural Midwest as a child left lasting impressions on his artistic direction, as many of his works themes included horizontal landscapes and horses. His time spent living there helped cultivate his love of wild nature. Throughout his life, Winter would periodically venture back to Northern New Mexico where he had built a studio in the desert, outside Taos, in 1939. He would travel along the Santa Fe Trail and the Sangre de Cristo Mountains where he found great inspiration from the flora and fauna of the region. Winter often did independent works based on his experiences in the countryside; capturing the saturated and diverse colors from different times of day, the textures of cacti, and the depth of the landscape, it was here that Winter felt he was most at home.

== Europe ==
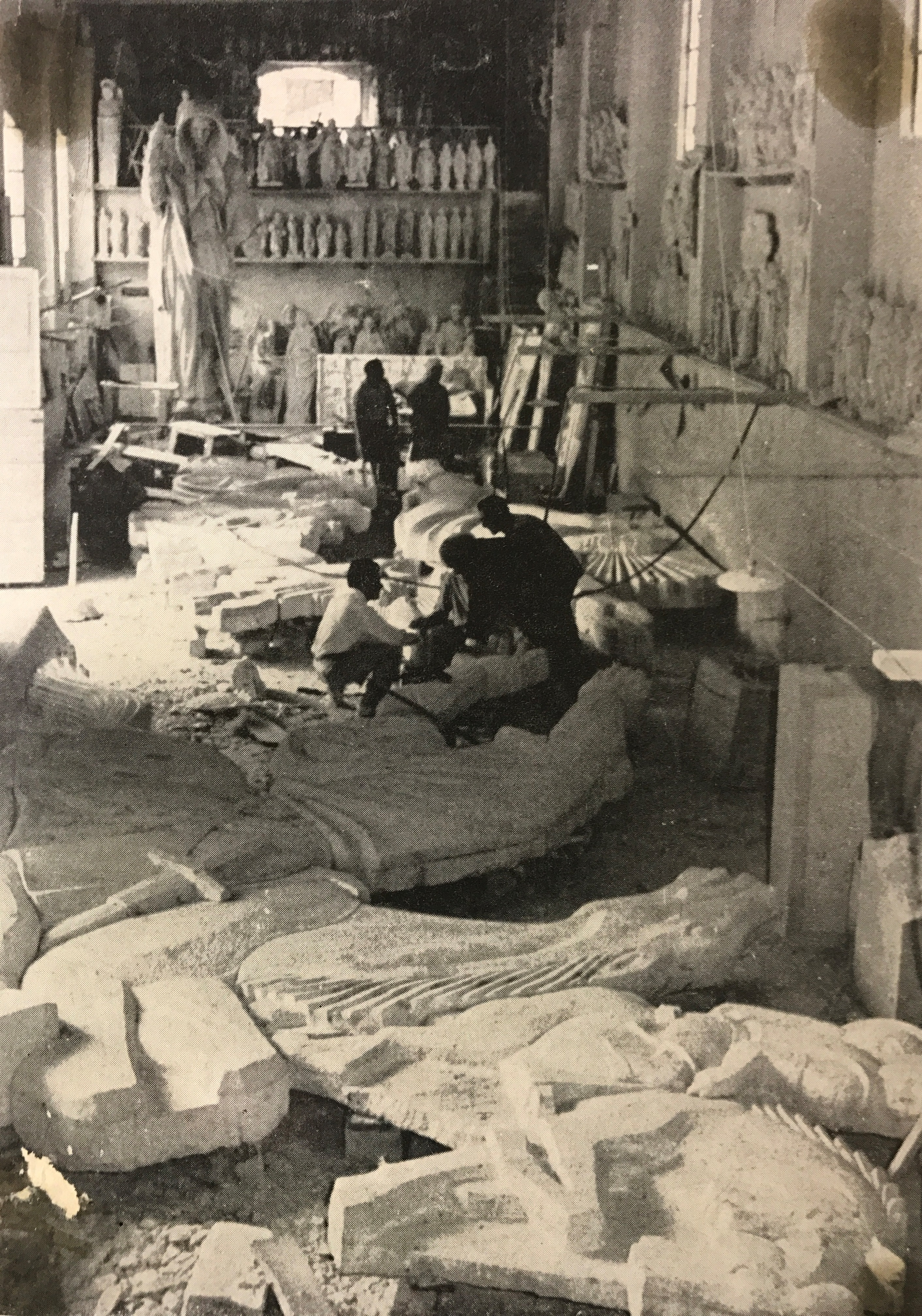
Lumen Martin Winter working on bas relief for The Conversion of St. Paul, Pietrasanta, Italy, 1958. The Long Island Museum collection.

Throughout his early career, Winter had great ambition to travel to Europe and assimilate the practices and stylistic approaches he would learn there into his own unique style. He was denied the opportunity to do so until the spring of 1951 when Winter was commissioned to create a replica of Leonardo da Vinci's The Last Supper. In preparation for this major undertaking, Winter was given the chance to travel to Europe with his assistant, Frank McQuade. For seventeen days, they explored galleries, museums, and churches in Paris, Florence, Rome, Milan, and Vinci, Leonardo's home town.

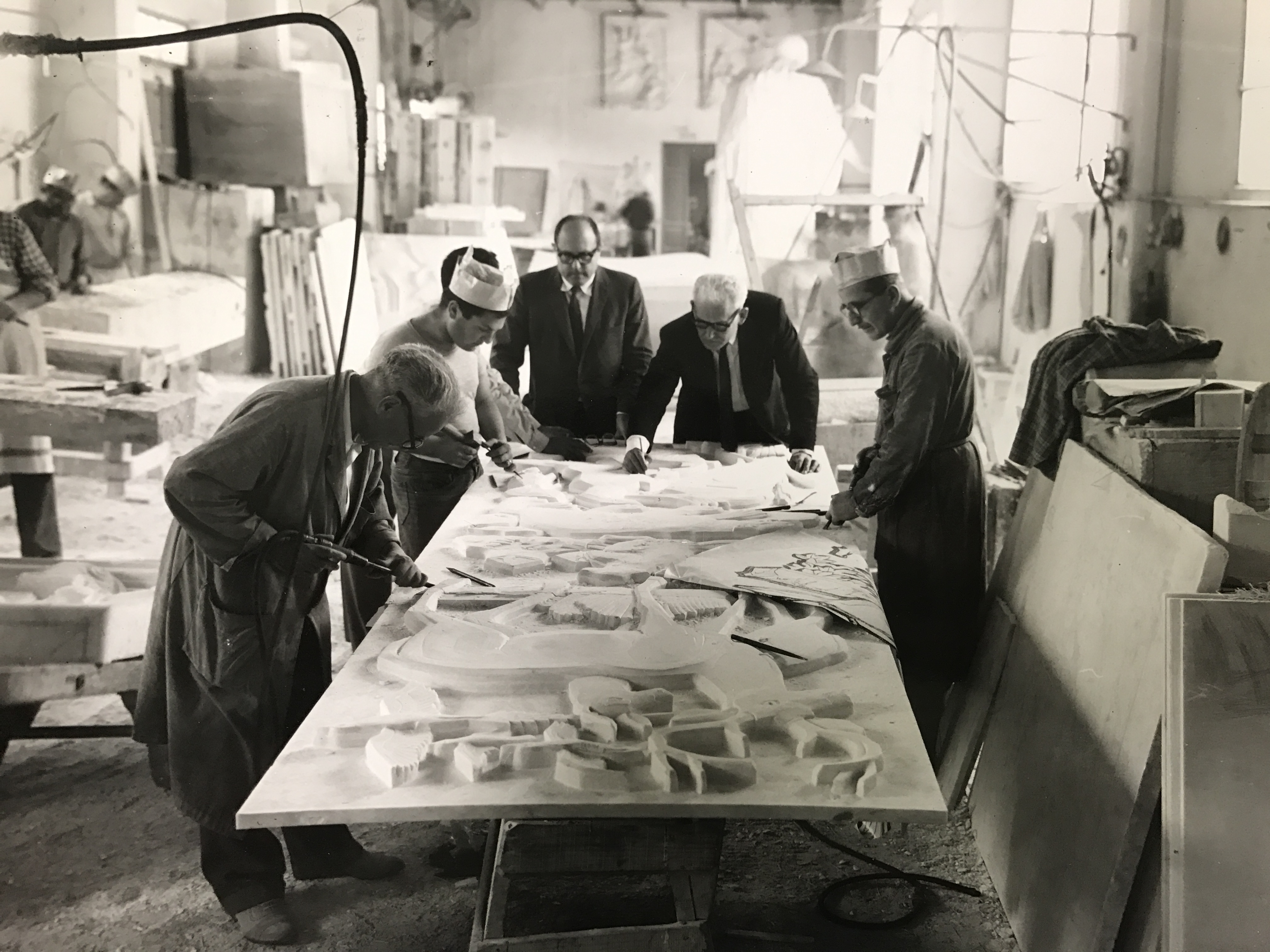
Lumen Martin Winter (center-right) leads the effort to carve marble panels for the National Wildlife Federation Building, Pietrasanta, Italy, 1960. The Long Island Museum collection.

The project would take Winter and three assistants three and a half months of nearly 15-hour days, 7 days a week to complete. Winter relied on other Leonardo paintings for reference as well as a Montorfano fresco of the Crucifixion positioned directly across from The Last Supper. It would take over four hundred pounds of paint to complete. The result of Winter's dedication merited a great deal of interest. Originally displayed in the Horton Museum, the replica now resides in the South Dining Hall of the University of Notre Dame in South Bend, Indiana. This project was the first in a long string of religious-oriented art created by Winter.

The Leonardo project provided an additional education for Winter and it gave the artist an initial exposure to Europe which satisfied his lifelong dream to travel there and absorb insights and in-person influences from Renaissance masterworks. It also provided a solid footing in Italy for Winter who would continue to develop connections to a sculpture firm in Pietrasanta throughout the 1950s. His relationship with this firm allowed Winter to complete some of his most significant public art and sculpture projects and enabled him to use the extensive marble quarries nearby.

== Public artist ==
Winters public career was driven greatly by the acclaim he achieved with his murals. In 1955, Winter was hired by the AFL-CIO to create a monumental glass mosaic mural, measuring 17×51 feet, for the lobby of the organization's new headquarters in Washington, D.C. The mural, consisting of 300,000 individual pieces, depicts a journey through America labor history. In 1973, Winter was invited back to AFL-CIO to create a companion mural for their new addition, on labor in the 20th-century space age.

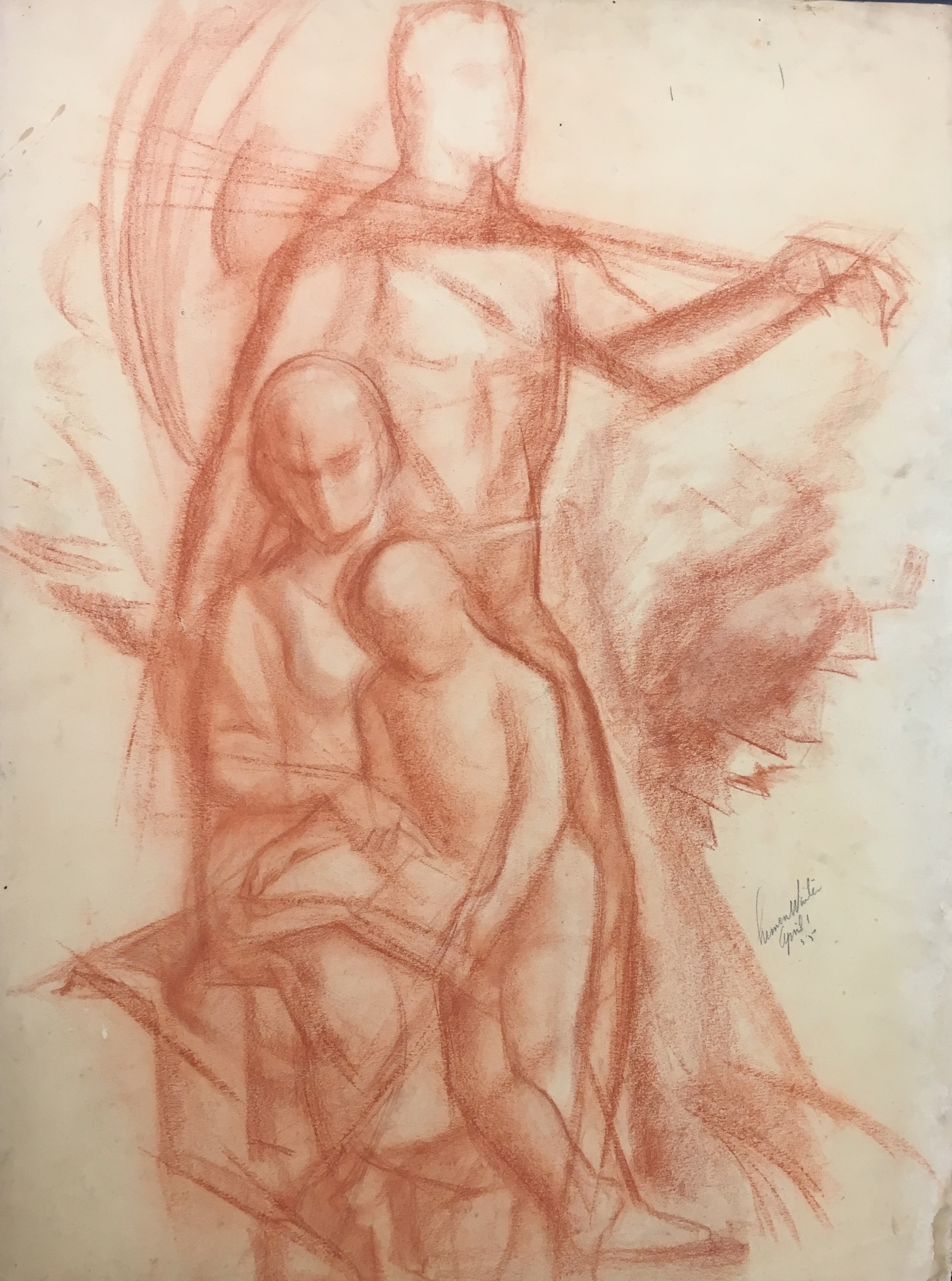
Central Figures in Sketch for AFI-CIO mural, red conte on paper, 1955. The Long Island Museum.

In 1961, Winter was hired to design and create thirteen carved marble and Venetian glass panels, each one 12 ft high by 4 ft wide, for the opening of the National Wildlife Federation Building. Dedicated by President John F. Kennedy on March 3, 1961, the glass covered marble depicted a total of 176 figures – moose, bears, wolves, and birds of every description.

Other Public Works:

- A 30×16 foot mural, titled Venus and Apollo, for the New York World's Fair Administration building, located below the fair’s heliport, in 1964. Winter used his twelve-year-old daughter Katie as the muse for Venus.
- Titans (1972), a pointillist-style 8×18 foot painting for the United Nations World Youth Assembly. The painting uses the color spectrum to represent the basic colors and creeds of all nations while depicting five giants representing the five continents moving the world out of darkness into light.
- Eight mural paintings on the second-floor rotunda of the Kansas State Capitol in Topeka, dedicated in 1978.
- The White Buffalo, an 8×8×5 foot marble sculpture of a buffalo, rearing horse and an Indian rider, based upon a Sioux legend, commissioned by the Kansas State Historical Society. Winter’s son, William completed the project due to Winter passing away before its completion.

== Family life ==
After moving to New York City (Brooklyn) in 1929, Winter married his first wife Maxine Marie Panney. Their marriage ended in 1938. In 1940, Winter moved to Cincinnati where he met and had a relationship with Mary Elizabeth Mason. They had a son together, Thomas Martin Winter (Lumen Martin Winter II), on January 12, 1943. Winter would later marry Grace Harmon on March 13, 1948. They had a son, William Grant Winter (1949) and a daughter, Catherine Winter (1950).

== Final years ==
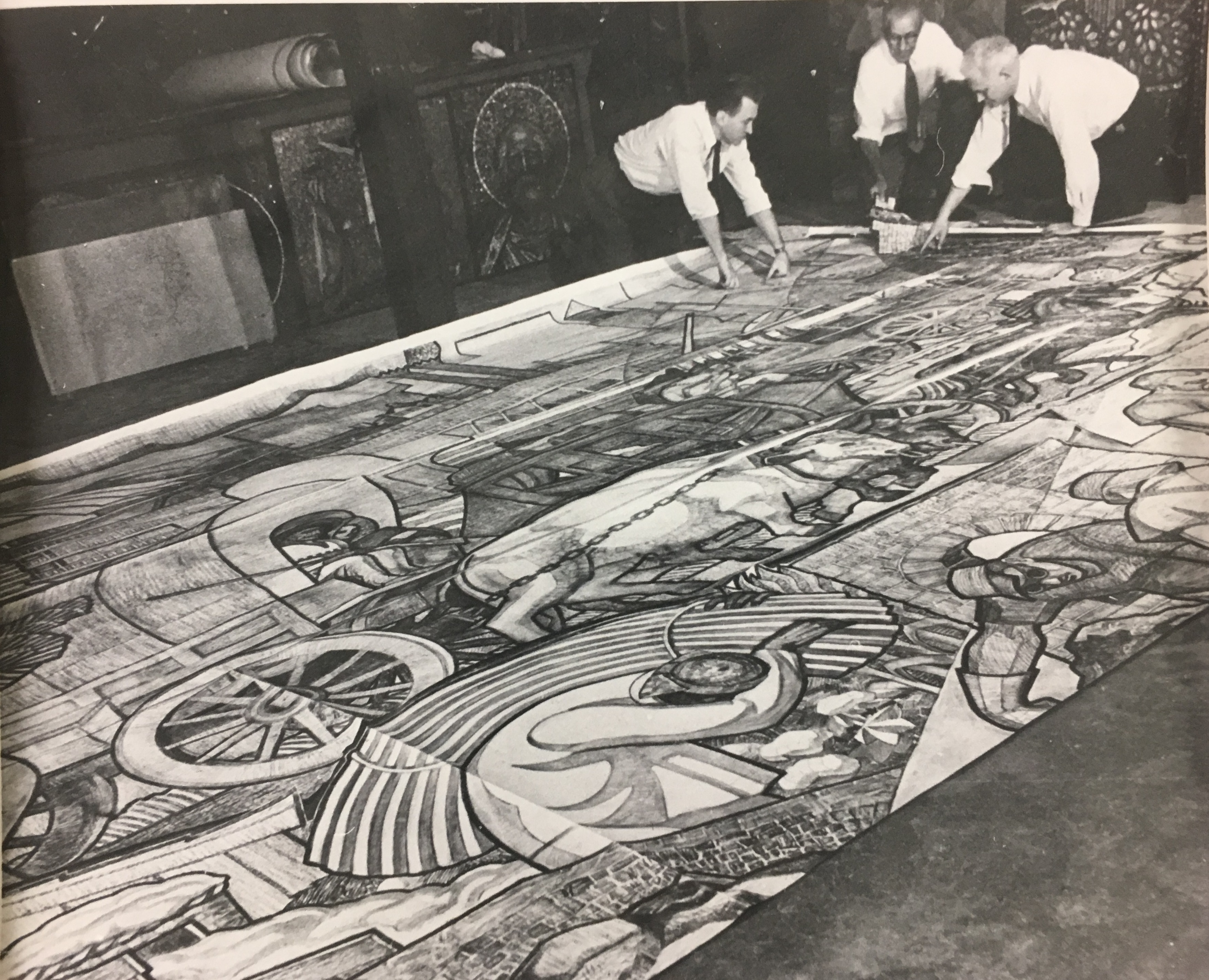
Winter working on cartoon with the Ravenna Mosaic Company, for the AFL-CIO mural, Washington, DC, 1956. The Long Island Museum.

Despite achieving many professional successes, Winter kept a low profile, spending relatively little money and devoting hours each day to his craft. Friends described a man who enjoyed jokes and was never overly solemn. Winter's studio was an active space, cluttered with half-finished watercolors and art books.

On April 5, 1982, Lumen Martin Winter died of cardiac arrest at his home in New Rochelle at 73 years old.

== Locations of Notable Works ==
- General Assembly at the United Nations, Titans
- Kansas Museum of History, Great White Buffalo
- HSBC Bank, at Avenue U and East 17th Street, Brooklyn, New York. Signed Lumen Winter, 1951.

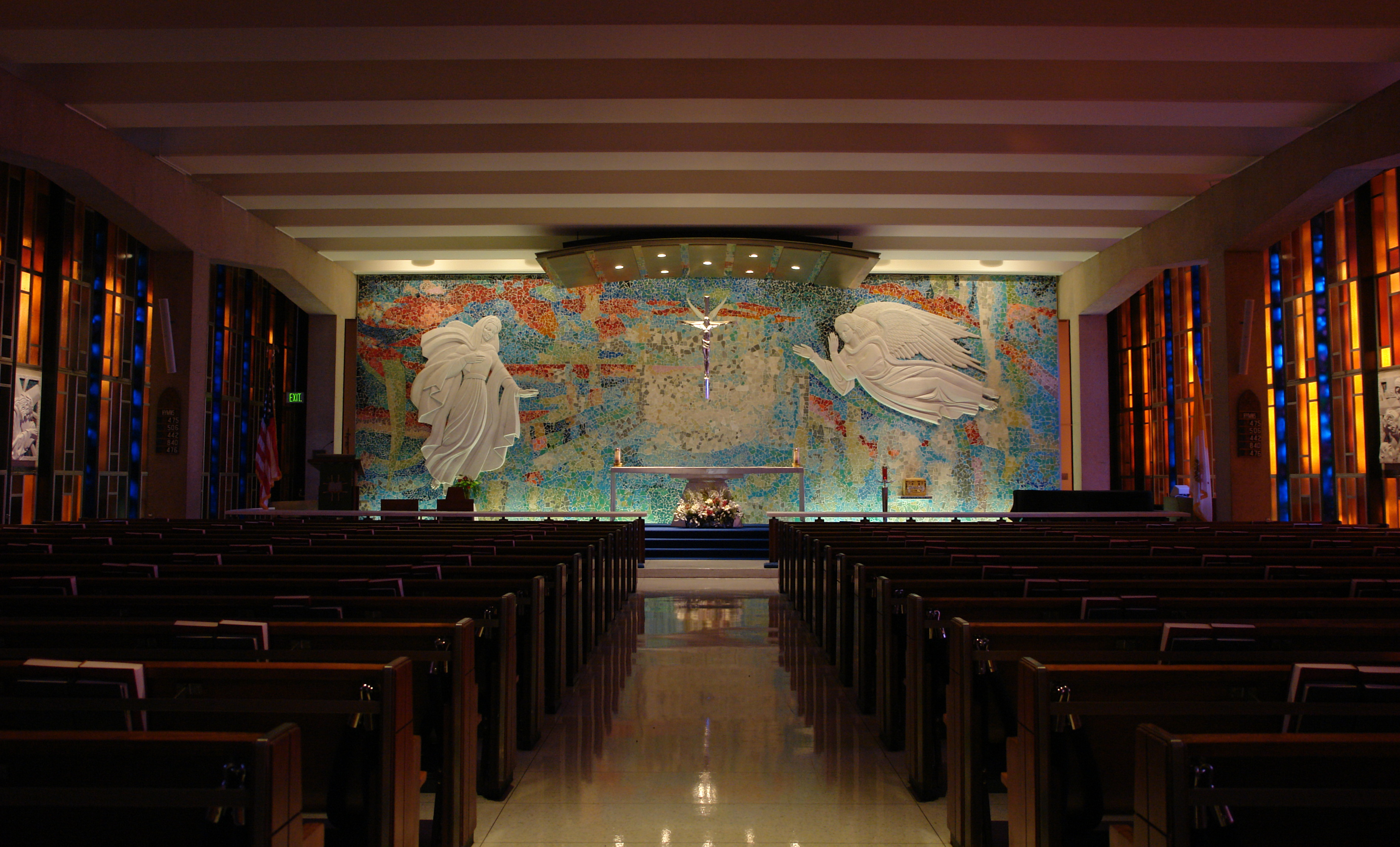
Interior of the Catholic Chapel in the lower floor of the Air Force Academy

- Mural, Threshing in Kansas, Hutchinson, Kansas, post office completed in 1942
- Tomb of Fr. Isaac Hecker with Angel of the Resurrection, Church of Saint Paul the Apostle, New York City (1959)
- Fishermen Mural, HSBC Bank, Brooklyn, New York, signed Lumen Winter, 1951
- Ascent (mural), Daytop Village
- National Wildlife Federation, Headquarters Building, Washington, D.C., dedicated by President John F. Kennedy
- Labor is Life, AFL-CIO Headquarters Building, Washington, D.C., dedicated by President Dwight D. Eisenhower
- Texas Abstract Mosaic, Lobby, Sheraton Hotel Southland Center, Dallas, Texas
- Six Wood Carvings, Vaqueros and Alamo Rooms, Southland Center, Dallas, Texas
- Stampede, Town Room, Southland Center, Dallas, Texas
- The Conversion of St. Paul, Facade, Church of St. Paul the Apostle, Lincoln Center, New York City * and The Angel of the Resurrection
- Rhapsody in Gold, Park Sheraton Hotel, New York City
- Our Lady of the Skies, U.S. Air Force Academy Chapel, Colorado Springs, Colorado
- Mosaic, Protestant area of the Air Force Academy Chapel
- National Bank of Washington, Georgetown, Washington, D.C.
- Union Central Life Insurance Company, Cincinnati, Ohio
- St. Francis with the Birds and Animals of Missouri, St. Francis Hospital, Marceline, Missouri
- Astor Home for Children, Rhinebeck, New York
- Cathedral College, Hillside, Long Island, New York
- Chapel, Hawthorne, New York
- P.S. #84, Brooklyn, New York
- Hotel St. Regis-Sheraton, New York, New York
- Steeds of Apollo, a medallion of the Apollo 13 mission insignia, struck by Franklin Mint
- South Shore High School (Brooklyn), New York
- Kansas State Capitol, Rotunda, Topeka, Kansas
