= Monte Maxwell =

American organist

- Maxwell in 2025

Background information
- Born: San Angelo, Texas
- Education: Texas Christian University (BMus), Curtis Institute of Music (ArtDip), Juilliard School (MMus)
- Instrument: Naval Academy Chapel Organ
- Years active: 1997-present
- Website: montemaxwell.com

Monte Maxwell is an organist currently serving as Director of Chapel Music and Chapel Organist at the United States Naval Academy.

== Early life and education ==
Maxwell was born in San Angelo, Texas. He began playing piano at the age of five and developed an interest in the organ from a young age.

Maxwell received a bachelor's degree in music at Texas Christian University in 1986 and was invited to study at the Curtis Institute of Music, where he earned an Artist Diploma in Organ Performance in 1988. He also earned a master's degree in music from the Juilliard School in 1990. Maxwell was mentored by John Weaver at the Curtis Institute.

Maxwell served as Staff Organist at the Wanamaker Organ in Philadelphia.

== Naval Academy ==
Maxwell began his service at the Naval Academy in February 1997. He performs primarily on the 15,688-pipe organ at the Naval Academy chapel.

He is known for his Halloween/All Saints' Day concert, which he started in 1997. During this annual performance, Maxwell often enters the stage in a coffin while being carried down the aisle. He arranges most of the music that he plays himself.

As of 2025, Maxwell is serving as the Director of Chapel Music and Chapel Organist. As of July 2024, Maxwell is serving as director of the Midshipmen Symphony Orchestra.

== Other performances ==
Maxwell also plays at weddings and other venues around the United States.
