= Naval Academy Chapel Organ =

The Naval Academy Chapel Organ is located in the United States Naval Academy Chapel in Annapolis, Maryland. The original instrument was built in 1908 by The Hutchings-Votey Organ Company of Boston, Massachusetts. When the chapel underwent remodeling in 1940, the M.P. Moller Pipe Organ Company of Hagerstown, Maryland was contracted to build a larger instrument to support music in the newly enlarged building. Through the generous gifts of various Naval Academy classes, the organ has undergone a number of enhancements and renovations. The current instrument, comprising both pipe and digital voices, totals 268 ranks and is controlled by two consoles.

The Main Organ Console, paid for by a gift from the Naval Academy Class of 1951, is one of the largest organ consoles in the world. Its specifications include:

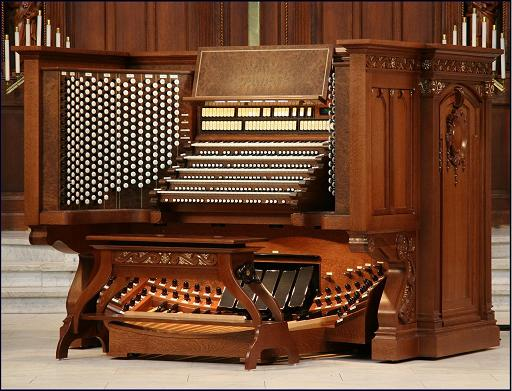
The Main Console

- 5 manuals
- 268 ranks plus percussion and traps
- 522 drawknobs (largest in the world)
- 796 total controls
- 15,688 equivalent pipes

The Main Console was crafted by R.A. Colby, Inc. of Johnson City, Tennessee. The previous console to occupy the chancel has been refurbished and installed in the aft gallery of the chapel. Both consoles operate by computer control systems furnished by Walker Technical Company of Zionsville, Pennsylvania, which also made the digital pipe reproduction voices.

The organ is featured weekly during worship services and weddings, as well as at special events throughout the year. The current chapel organist, Monte Maxwell, performs multiple full-length concerts annually, including the Commissioning Week Organ Concert and the Halloween/All Saints Day Concert.
