= United States Air Force Academy, Cadet Area =

- U.S. National Register of Historic Places
- U.S. National Historic Landmark District
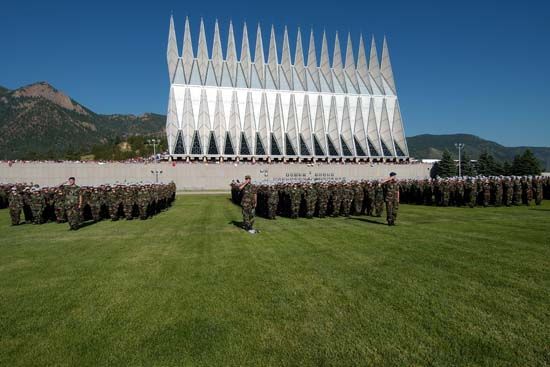
- Cadet Chapel

- Location within Colorado Location within the United States
- Nearest city: Colorado Springs, Colorado
- Coordinates: 39.008°N 104.89°W
- Area: 25 acres (10 ha) (landmarked area)
- Built: 1958; 68 years ago
- Architect: Walter Netsch, Jr. Skidmore, Owings & Merrill
- Architectural style: Modern
- NRHP reference No.: 04000484

Significant dates
- Added to NRHP: April 1, 2004
- Designated NHLD: April 1, 2004

The United States Air Force Academy, Cadet Area is a portion of the United States Air Force Academy near Colorado Springs, Colorado. Its use of modern architecture stands in contrast with the very traditional designs of West Point and the United States Naval Academy. It was designated a National Historic Landmark District in 2004 for its landscape, architecture, and historic importance as a military academy.

The buildings in the Cadet Area were designed in a distinct, modernist style, and make extensive use of aluminum on building exteriors, suggesting the outer skin of aircraft or spacecraft. The elevation is approximately 7,200 feet (2,190 m) above sea level.

== The Terrazzo ==
The Terrazzo from Fairchild Hall

The main buildings in the Cadet Area are set around a large, square pavilion known as The Terrazzo. The name comes from the fact that the walkways are made of terrazzo tiles, set among a checkerboard of marble strips. The east quarter of the Terrazzo, known as the "Air Gardens," is a 700-foot-long (210 m) space with an ordered geometry of lighted pools, lowered grass sections and maze-like walkways. The Terrazzo area was designed by landscape architect Dan Kiley.

The center of the Cadet Area was originally a wooded, sloping hill that extended from the middle of the Terrazzo south to the valley below, creating a blend of natural and man-made environments. With the building of Sijan Hall on the south side of the Terrazzo in 1968, the Terrazzo area was effectively enclosed into a large quadrangle, and this natural part of the landscape was eliminated. Only the top of the hill, now known as "Spirit Hill", remains in the central grassy area of the Terrazzo.

== Cadet Chapel ==
The most recognizable building in the Cadet Area is the 17-spired Cadet Chapel. The subject of controversy when built, it is now considered among the most beautiful examples of modern American academic architecture. The structure consists of 100 identical aluminum tetrahedrons, with colored glass in the spaces between the tetrahedrons. The chapel reaches a height of 150 feet (46 m), with an overall length of 280 feet (85 m) and a width of 84 feet (26 m).

Architect Walter Netsch said he was inspired in his design by the Sainte-Chapelle cathedral in Paris, the Cathedral of Chartres and the Basilica of San Francesco d'Assisi in Italy. Built on two levels, the upper portion houses a 1,300-seat multi-denomination Protestant chapel; downstairs are a 500-seat Catholic chapel, a 100-seat Jewish chapel, and interfaith rooms used for services of other religions.

== Dormitories ==
Cadets live in two dormitories, Vandenberg Hall and Sijan Hall. The former is the original dormitory and honors General Hoyt Vandenberg, the Chief of Staff of the Air Force from 1948 to 1953. Sijan Hall was built on the south side of the Cadet Area in 1968, in order to accommodate the expansion of the Cadet Wing to a strength of 4,417 cadets. Known simply as the "New Dorm" until its dedication on May 31, 1976, it was named after Captain Lance Sijan '65, the first USAFA graduate to be awarded the Medal of Honor.

== Academic buildings ==
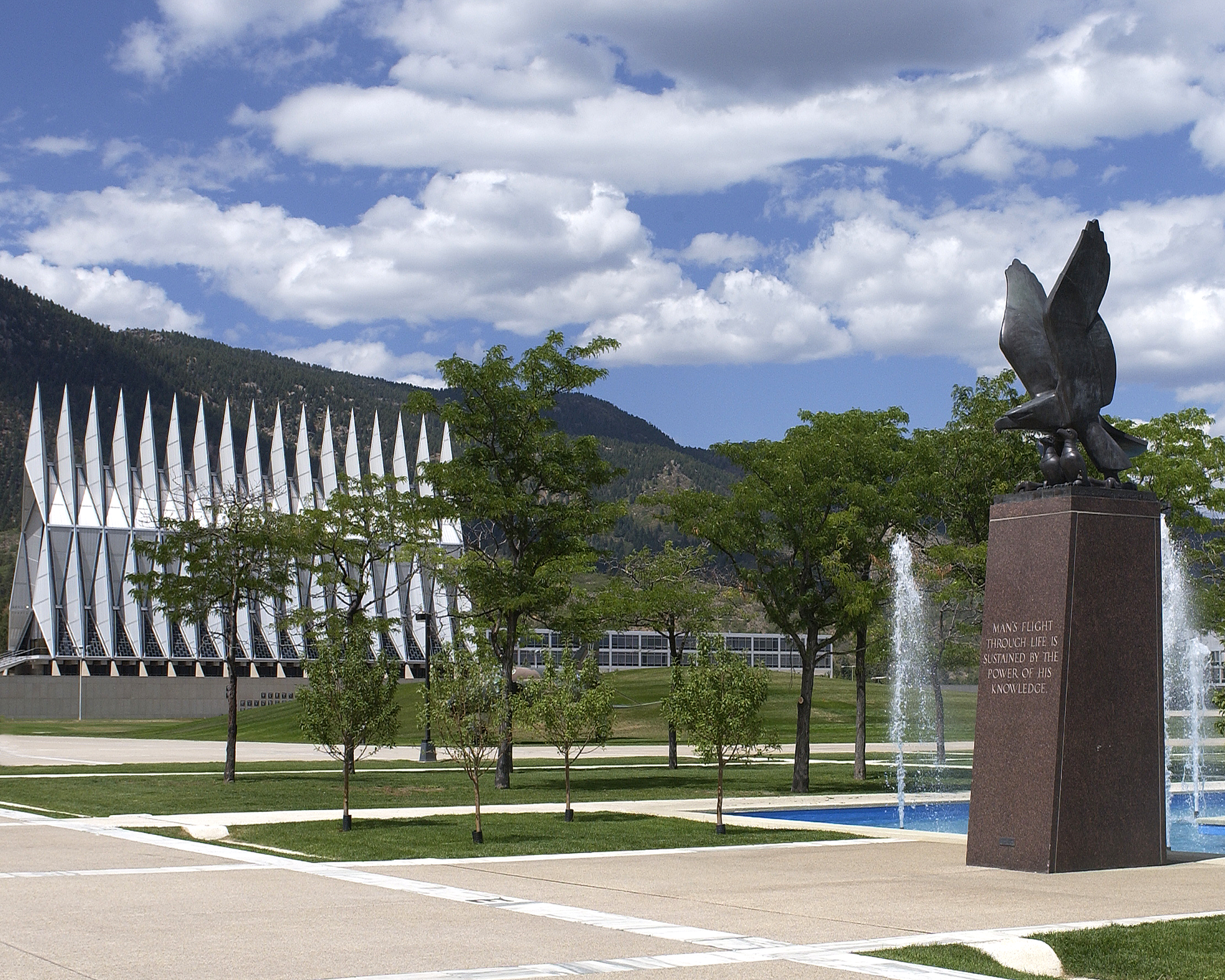
The Air Gardens form the east quarter of the Terrazzo

Several buildings in the Cadet Area are used for academics. Fairchild Hall, named after General Muir S. Fairchild, the first commander of Air University and later Vice Chief of Staff of the Air Force, is the main academic building. Fairchild Hall houses academic classrooms, laboratories, research facilities, faculty offices. The Robert F. McDermott Library is a separate building.

The Aeronautics Research Center (also known as the "Aero Lab") is just south of Fairchild Hall and contains numerous aeronautical research facilities, including transonic, subsonic, low speed and cascade wind tunnels, engine and rocket test cells and simulators.

The Consolidated Education and Training Facility (CETF) was built in 1997 as an annex to Fairchild Hall. It contains chemistry and biology classrooms and labs, medical and dental clinics and civil engineering and astronautics laboratories. The Cadet Area also contains an observatory and a planetarium for academic use.

== Dining and entertainment facilities ==
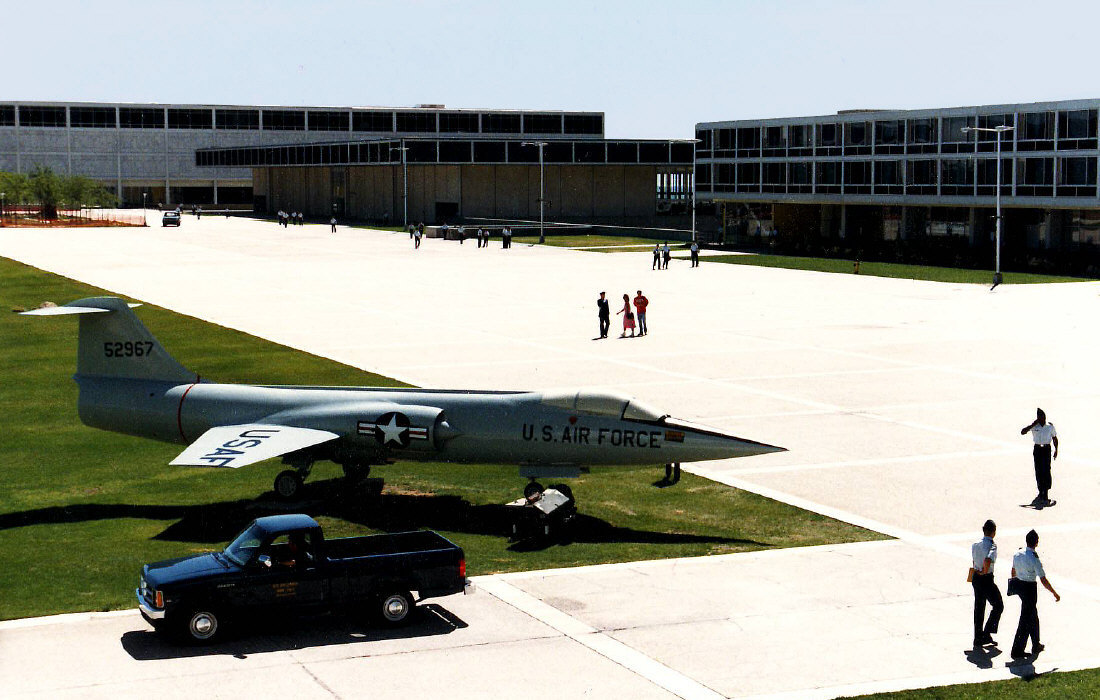
The Terrazzo from the chapel wall, showing (l to r) Fairchild, Mitchell, and Sijan Halls with an F-104 static display (since replaced by an F-15 Eagle)

Mitchell Hall, named after air power pioneer Brigadier General William "Billy" Mitchell, is the cadet dining facility, which has the ability to feed the entire Cadet Wing at one time.

The cadet social center is Arnold Hall, named after General of the Air Force Henry H. "Hap" Arnold, commanding general of the U.S. Army Air Forces during World War II. Arnold Hall is located just outside the Cadet Area and houses a 3,000-seat theater, ballroom, and a number of lounge and recreation facilities for cadets and visitors.

== Administration building ==
Harmon Hall is the primary administration building, which houses the offices of the Superintendent and supporting staff. It is named after Lieutenant General Hubert R. Harmon, the academy's first superintendent (1954–1956).

== Sports facilities ==
The Cadet Area also contains extensive facilities for use by cadets participating in intercollegiate athletics, intramural athletics, physical education classes and other physical training. Set amid numerous outdoor athletic fields, the Cadet Gymnasium contains basketball gyms, indoor tennis courts, an Olympic-size swimming and diving pool, a water polo pool, numerous squash and racquetball courts, two weight-training rooms with state-of-the-art equipment and specialized facilities for volleyball, fencing, gymnastics, boxing, and the rifle team. The gymnasium also houses a human performance laboratory complete with hydrostatic weighing equipment, sports psychology and vision testing capabilities and aerobic testing equipment, including an elevation chamber.

The Cadet Fieldhouse contains the 6,000-seat Clune Arena (named after long-time USAFA Director of Athletics Colonel John J. Clune), a 2,600-seat ice hockey rink and an indoor track that doubles as a practice facility for a number of sports throughout the year.

== See also ==
- List of National Historic Landmarks in Colorado
- National Register of Historic Places listings in El Paso County, Colorado
