= Chapel of the Most Holy Trinity (West Point) =

West Point Catholic Chapel
- Chapel of the Most Holy Trinity
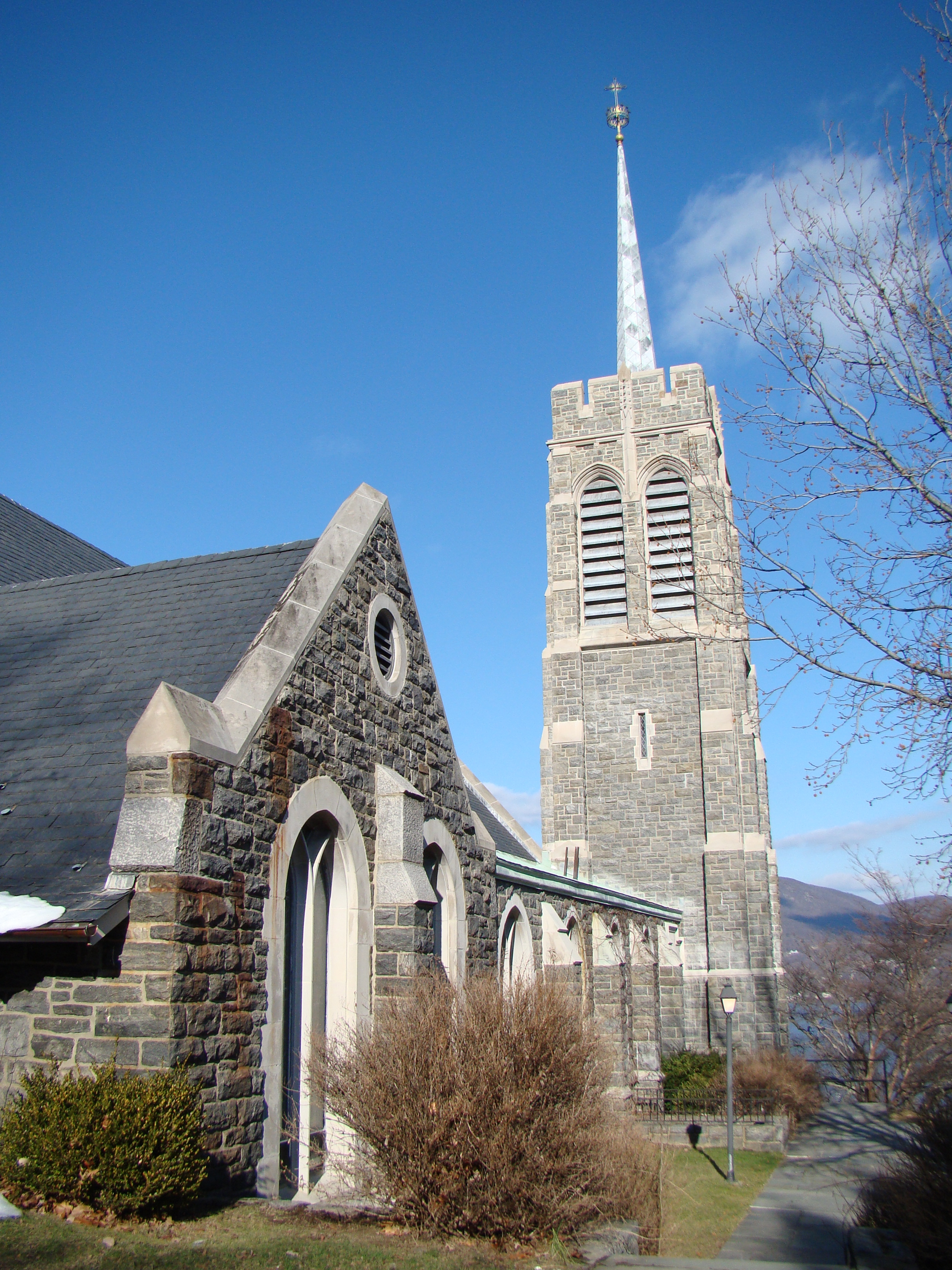
- West Point Catholic Chapel, the Chapel of the Most Holy Trinity
- West Point Catholic Chapel
- 41°23′39.86″N 73°57′46.52″W
- Location: United States Military Academy; West Point, New York
- Country: United States
- Denomination: Roman Catholic
- Website: Website

History
- Status: Church
- Founded: 1899
- Founder: Monsignor Cornelius O'Keefe
- Dedicated: 1900
- Consecrated: 1900

Architecture
- Functional status: Active
- Style: Gothic Revival
- Completed: 1900

Administration
- Archdiocese: Military Services, USA

Clergy
- Priest: Father Wood (d. 2014)
- Pastor: CH (CPT) Raymond Akeriwe

The Chapel of the Most Holy Trinity is a Catholic church at the United States Military Academy in West Point, New York. Completed in 1900, it is the oldest chapel in continual use on the West Point campus. The chapel was expanded in 1959.

== See also ==
- United States Army Chaplain Corps
- United States Air Force Academy Cadet Chapel (including Catholic chapel)
