= United States Military Academy grounds and facilities =

- U.S. Military Academy
- U.S. National Register of Historic Places
- U.S. National Historic Landmark District
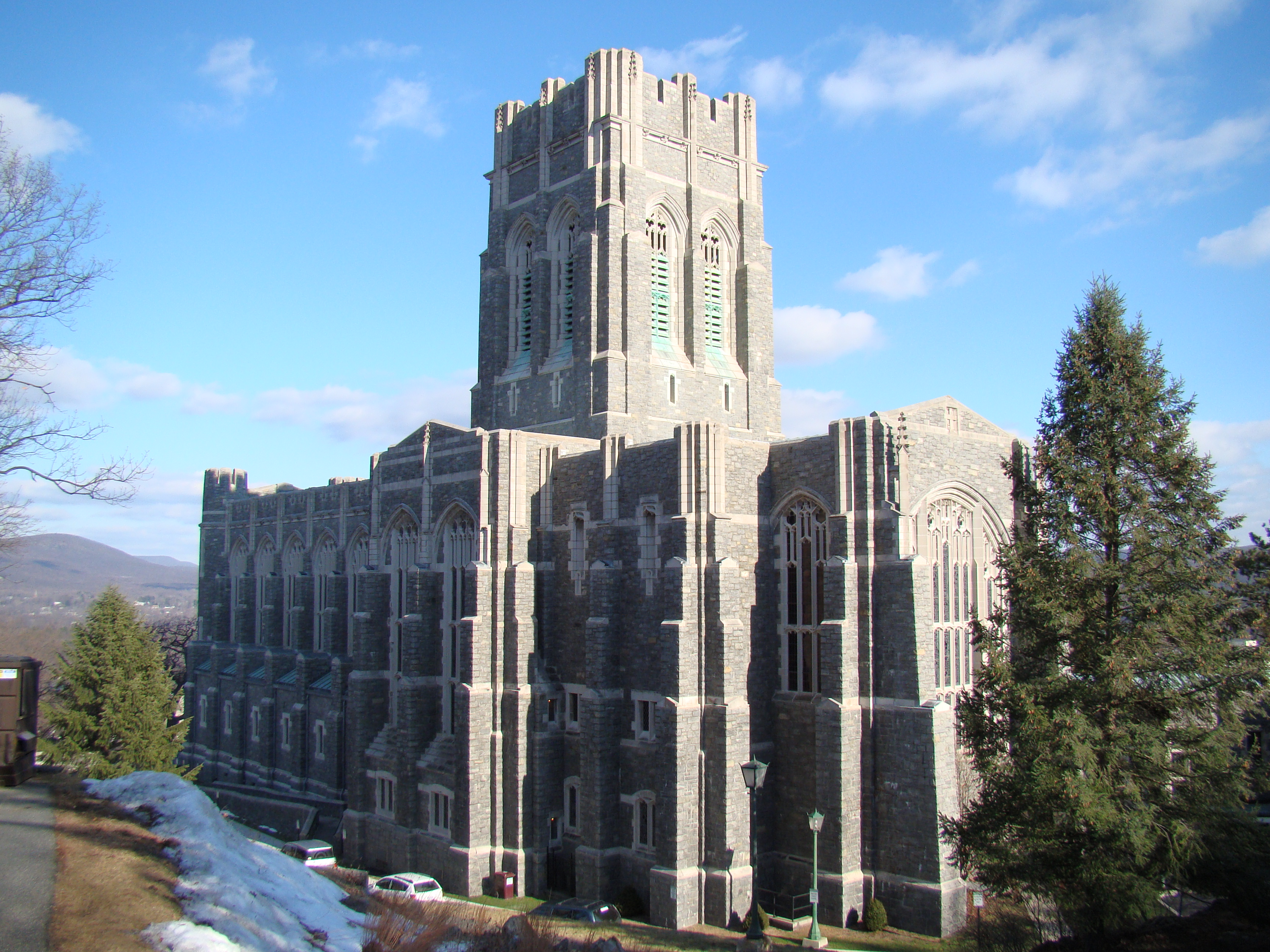
- Cadet Chapel

- Location within New York
- Location: NY 218, West Point, New York
- Coordinates: 41°23′34″N 73°57′30″W
- Area: 2,500 acres (1,000 ha)
- Built: 1775
- Architect: Multiple
- Architectural style: Classical Revival, Tudor Revival, Federal
- NRHP reference No.: 66000562

Significant dates
- Added to NRHP: 15 October 1966
- Designated NHLD: 15 October 1966

The United States Military Academy (West Point) and grounds were declared a National Historic Landmark in 1960 due to the Revolutionary War history and the age and historic significance of the academy itself. The majority of the buildings in the central cadet area are historic.

The West Point Military Reservation, in Orange County, is mostly in Highlands Town. The majority of that area is in the West Point census-designated place, and portions extend into the Fort Montgomery CDP. Portions of the reservation extend into Woodbury and Cornwall Town.

== Geography ==
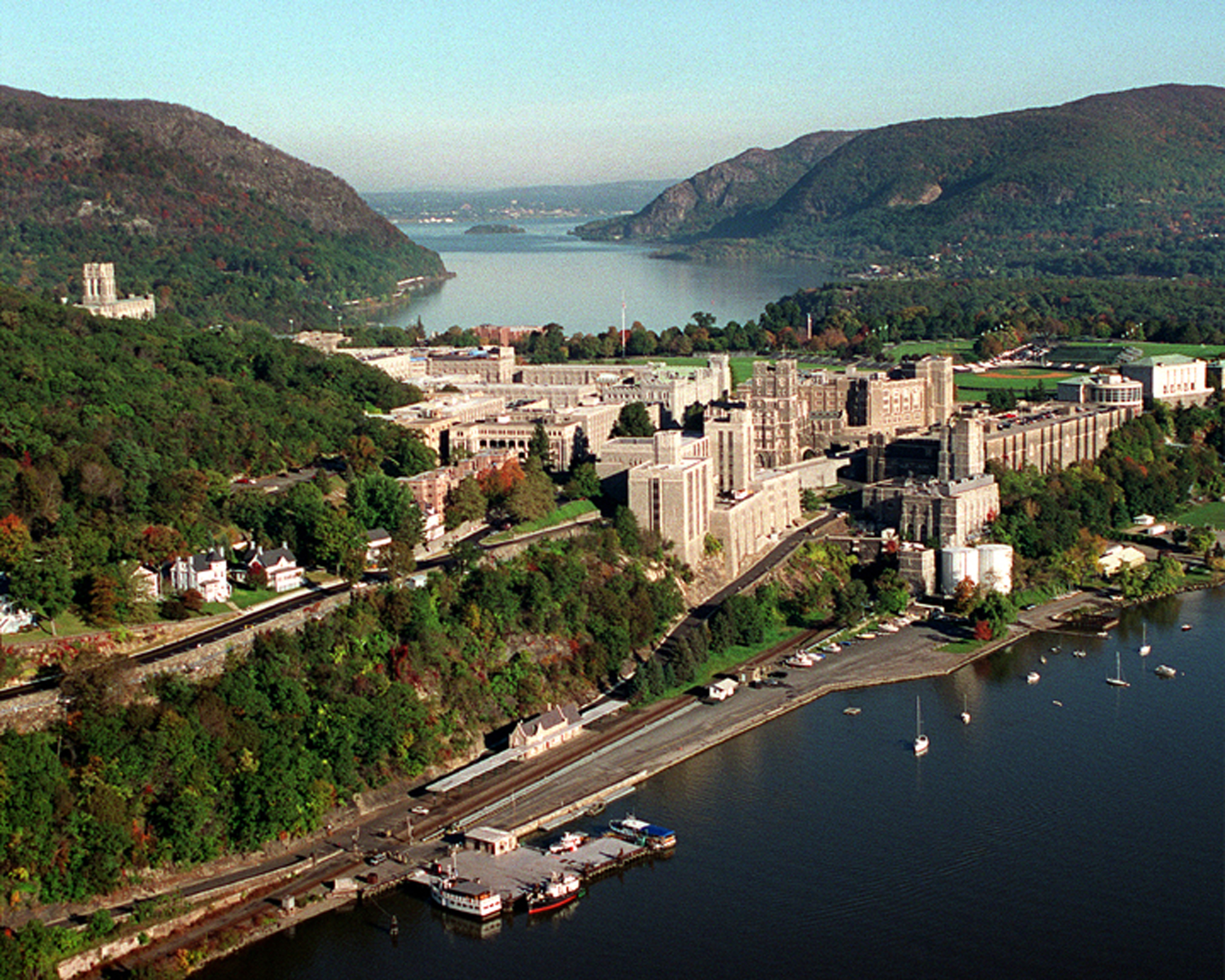
Central post occupies the relatively level terrain of the Plain

West Point is located approximately 50 miles (80 km) north of New York City on the western bank of the Hudson River. The academy's geographic location and geologic formations have directly shaped its history, for example, there wouldn't be a military garrison at West Point were it not for the narrow "s-curve" in the river, creating a "west point" in the river that was incredibly important for controlling shipping traffic on the Hudson during colonial times. In addition to the narrow double-90-degree turns, the currents and winds were erratic and unpredictable, even making an unopposed navigation difficult. In addition to the strategic shape of the Hudson River, the Highlands rise up sharply from river level to 1,400 feet (430 m) at some places in the immediate area. The combination of the narrow river turns and the commanding high ground made this place the perfect location for the Continental Army to build its stronghold against British troop movement into upstate New York during the American Revolution. The Continental Army first occupied the relatively level plain and constructed Fort Clinton and supporting redoubts and batteries of artillery on prominent hills in the area and across the river on Constitution Island. Guests of cadets who visit Flirtation Walk can experience glimpses of the Revolutionary War era terrain as the shoreline along the river below the plain has not changed much in over 200 years. It wasn't until after the war that congress purchased the land upon where Fort Clinton stood. In 1790, Congress purchased an initial tract of 1,700 acres (6.9 km^{2}) from a Stephen Moore of North Carolina.

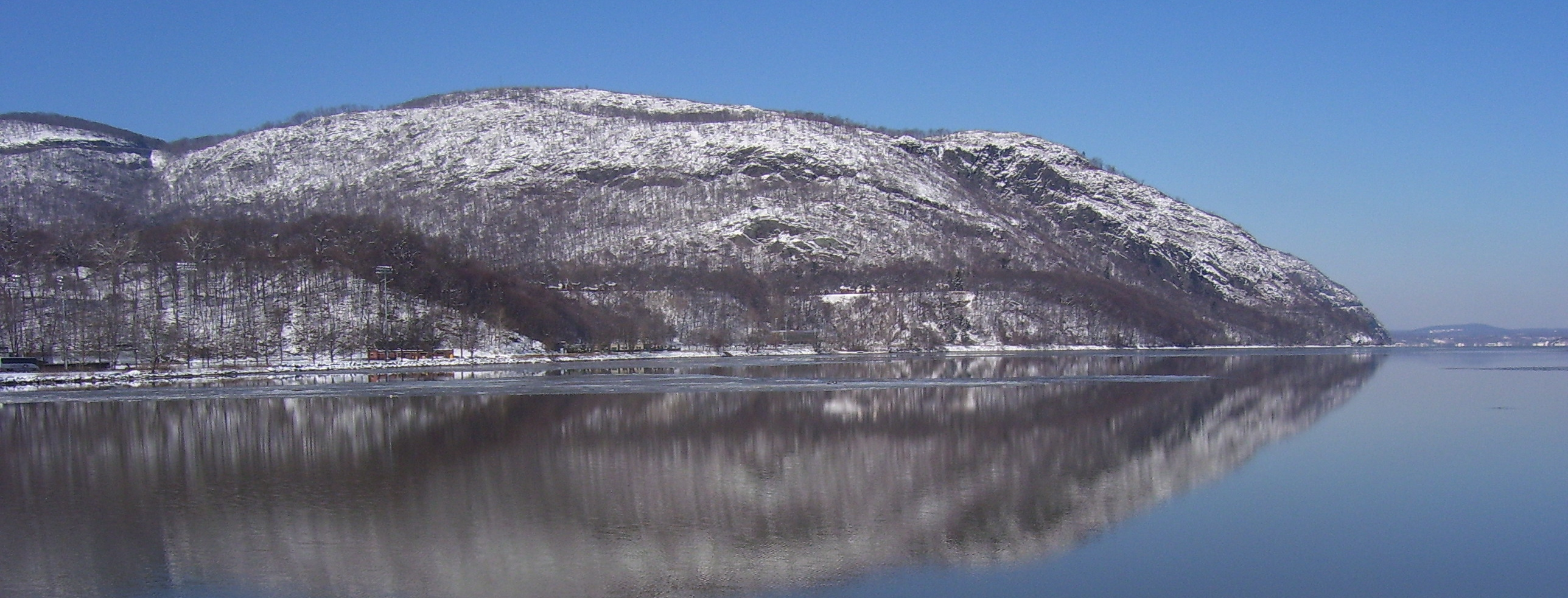
At just over 1,400 feet, Crow's Nest is the highest point on the reservation

For the first hundred years of the academy, ship-board traffic, then later rail-traffic, were the only ways to access West Point from New York City. In the years immediately following the Revolutionary War, the Hudson Highlands surrounding West Point were sparsely populated and often harbored "gangs of thieves". An 1819 letter from superintendent Sylvanus Thayer complained to the Secretary War John C. Calhoun of the lawlessness of the local inhabitants in the highlands surrounding West Point. As transportation technology improved and coal became the dominant source of energy consumption, the wildness of the highlands subsided and the hill people whose lives were linked to subsistence upon the forest began to disappear. By the turn of the century, the academy had begun to expand beyond the immediate reaches of the Plain and grew both south along the river and westward into the highlands.

== History ==
The entire central post was designated a National Historic Landmark in 1960, but none of the occupied structures on post date to the Revolutionary War period. The oldest surviving buildings are the residences of the Superintendent and the Commandant. Local legend states that one of the foundation walls of the Warner House on Constitution Island dates to the revolutionary war period, but that has never been verified through documentation. Through much of the first 150 years, progress superseded historical preservation as the norm at the academy and many of the most historically significant and grand structures of the "old academy" were demolished to make way for newer and more functionally modern structures.

=== Revolutionary war structures & sites ===
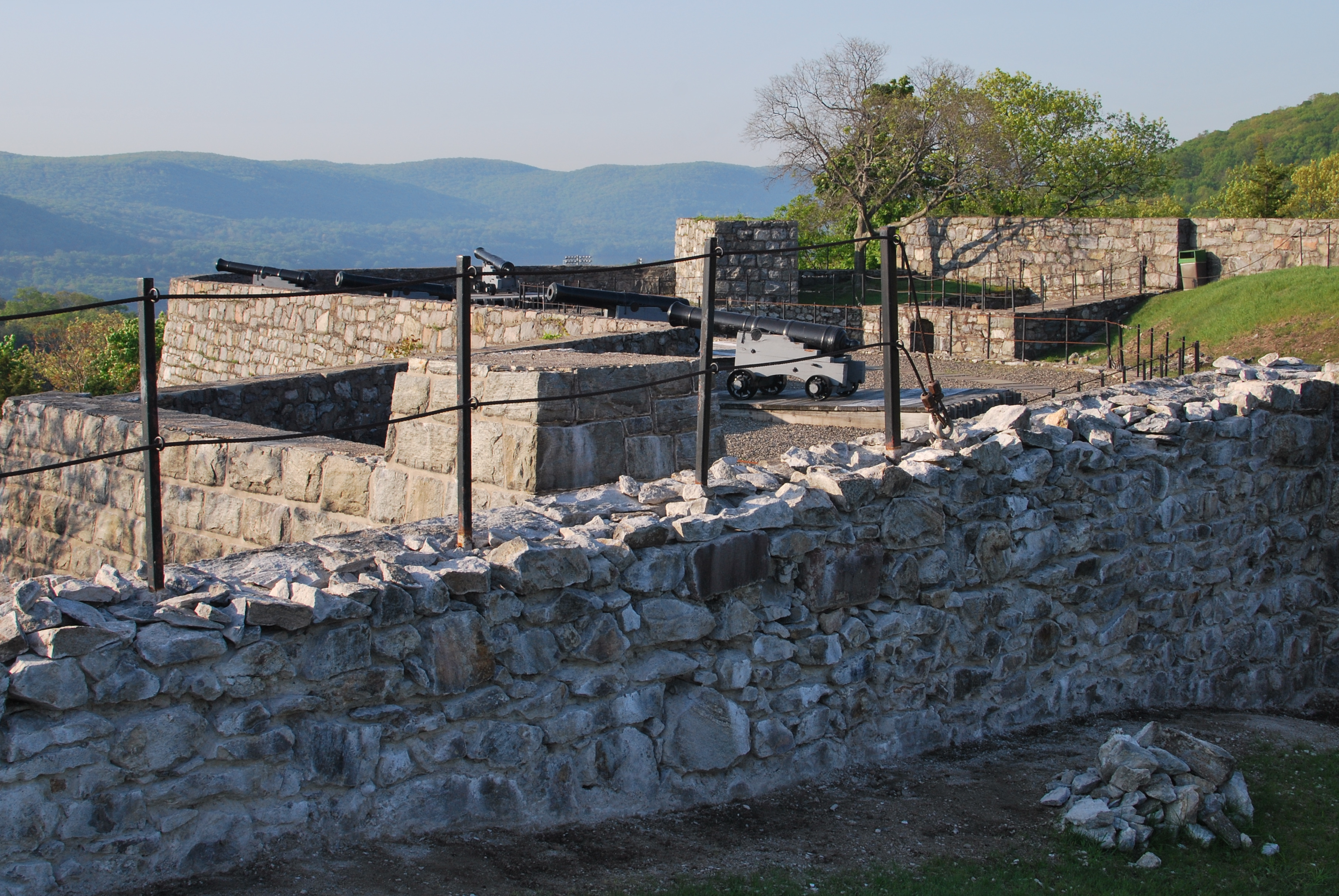
Fort Putnam

The garrison at West Point originally centered on Fort Clinton, the Great Chain, and the defenses built upon Constitution Island. Many of the revolutionary war fortifications still dot the more remote landscape of the academy grounds. Some have been nearly fully restored, such as Fort Putnam, while some have been partially restored, such as Redoubt 4, and some are almost completely reduced to little more than historical markers, such as Fort Clinton. Numerous redoubts were constructed in support of Fort Clinton. Those who survive to present day were fortunate to be in hard-to-reach places that did not impede in the expansion of the academy. Redoubts that are long since lost to time and progress included several in the vicinity of the Warner House on Constitution island, and two small outposts near the present day Lusk Reservoir housing area. In the academy's first one hundred years or so, there was little thought given to preserving these historical fortifications as the remains of Ft. Clinton fell into disrepair and were eventually demolished and some of the smaller redoubts were scavenged for their stone or razed to make room for other structures. One of the more notable remaining Revolutionary War sites is Kosciuszko's Garden, which sits on the east-facing cliff side about 40 feet (12 m) below present day Cullum Hall. Immediately after the war's conclusion, Revolutionary War-era barracks and quarters served the academic mission of the fledgling academy. Records of these structures have been lost to time and a fire in 1838.

=== Historical academy structures of significance that no longer exist ===
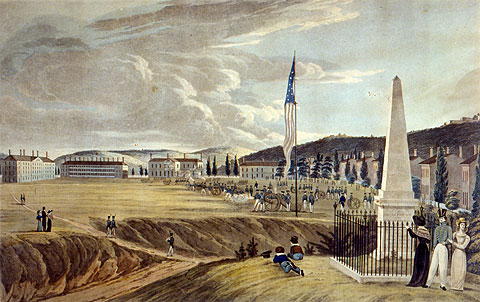
The Plain in 1828. The barracks, academic building, & mess hall from this painting are long since demolished and Wood's Monument is moved to the West Point Cemetery

In 1808, six years after the formal founding of the academy, Congress authorized the expansion of the Corps of Cadets from only a handful to nearly 300. Along with this increase in personnel came the funding to house them. The first formal set of barracks were constructed in 1815 and 1817 and were known as North and South Barracks. These structures housed the Corps of Cadets until they were replaced and demolished in the early 1850s. The main academic building, known simply as "the Academy", was also constructed in 1815. These three buildings are depicted in the 1828 painting by George Catlin to the left. On 19 February 1838, a fire destroyed the original academic building and most of the academy's records. The replacement of the original "academy", was constructed on the site of present-day Pershing Barracks in 1839 and remained in use until 1891. This academic building was three levels tall and multipurpose, with a large open floor plan on the ground floor that doubled as a riding hall during the winter months. In 1829, the West Point Hotel was built on the eastern edge of Trophy Point. The hotel would stand overlooking the Hudson River for a century until it was demolished in the early 1930s, several years after the construction of the Thayer Hotel. In 1841, superintendent Richard Delafield oversaw the construction of the old cadet library and observatory, which stood at the intersection of Cullum Road and Jefferson Place near present-day Cullum Hall and the second cadet library. That library stood on the southern edge of the Plain for 119 years before it was demolished in 1960. That library was built in the style known as Tudor Gothic and helped set the tone of future buildings on the edge of the plain. The offices of the Superintendent, Adjutant, Quartermaster, & Treasurer were in the library until the new Headquarters was built in 1870. The old library's observatory had to be moved up the hill near Lusk Reservoir when a train tunnel was constructed under the Plain in 1880. The observatory stood at the top of the hill above the cadet chapel until it was closed and demolished in the 1950s. In 1851, Delafield oversaw a major overhaul in the barracks conditions with the construction of more modern barracks, built in the "division" style that is still prevalent in the older remaining barracks on post. These barracks, known as "Old Central Barracks" remained in use for over 100 years before being demolished in the 1960s. Today, only the 1st Division remains, standing as a monument in the cadet central area, preserved as "Nininger Hall", which houses the Cadet Honor Committee.

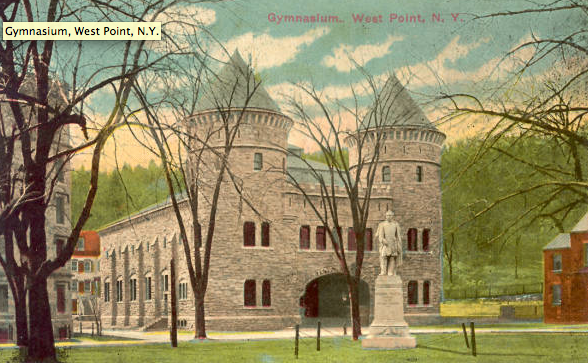
The Richard Morris Hunt-designed gymnasium which occupied the site of present-day Washington Hall

The "Old Cadet Mess Hall" was built on the site of the current Grant Hall in 1852 and served as the dining hall for the Corps of Cadets until it was replaced by Washington Hall and demolished in 1930 to make way for the current Grant Hall. In 1852, Delafield oversaw the construction of the Commandant's headquarter's building and cadet guardhouse on the site of present-day Bradley Barracks. This building helped encircle the cadet "central area", which is similar to the courtyard known in present-day as "Central Area". The Commandant's office was demolished in 1920. The Commandant's offices are on the 4th floor of Washington Hall overlooking the Plain. On the site of present-day Thayer Hall, on the lower rises of the cliffs along the Hudson, the Old Riding Hall was constructed beginning in 1855. The structure was known as the largest equestrian riding hall in the US during its day. This hall stood on the cliff below the Plain until being demolished for a new riding hall in 1908. In 1870, the new academy headquarters building was constructed on the site of present-day Taylor Hall. Meant to house the Superintendent and other academy leadership and staff, this building was too small and inadequate shortly after construction and it was demolished shortly after 1900 to make way for the construction of Taylor Hall. A cadet hospital was constructed in 1884 on the site of present-day Lee Barracks. In 1923, a new wing of the hospital was built, which now houses the Office of Admissions. The main hospital building was demolished in 1960 to make way for Lee Barracks. In the late 1880s Richard Morris Hunt was contracted to design several buildings. The first was a gymnasium, begun in 1891 in a Romanesque Revival design with two large towers flanking a grand arched entrance. The gymnasium was opened in 1893 and used until the early 1920s, when it was demolished to make way for the new mess hall, Washington Hall.

=== Structures from the 19th century still in use in the academic area ===
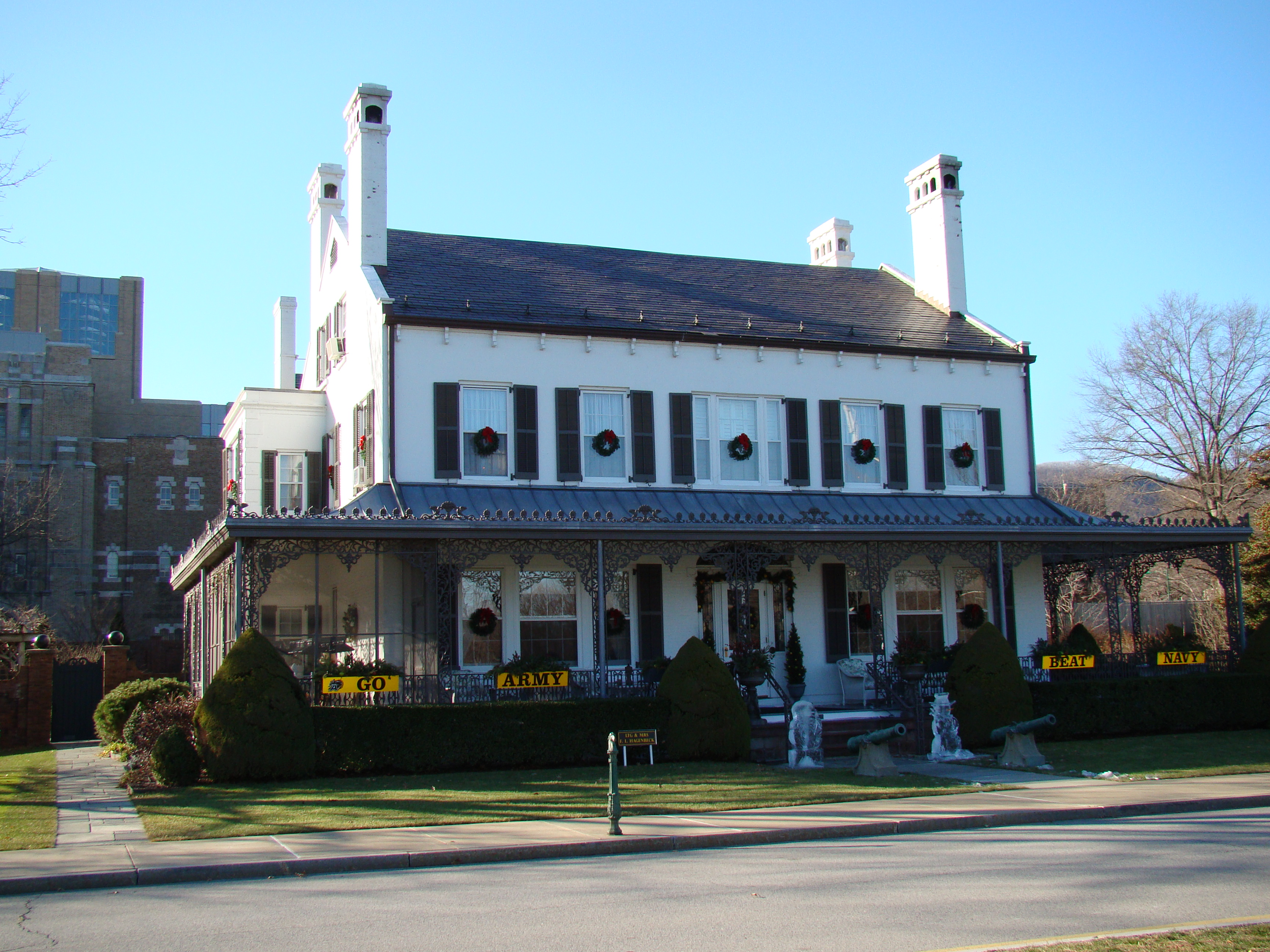
Superintendent's Quarters (1820), one of the oldest remaining building on post

The Superintendent's quarters (1820) and the Commandant's quarters (1821) were constructed on the end of Jefferson Place near the intersection with Washington Road. During the 1800s, Jefferson Road extended further south through what is now North Area and a row of officers' quarters once lined the west side of the road south of the Superintendent's quarters, but those structures were all demolished to make room for the old North Barracks. The next oldest structures on post are the three sets of large duplex officers' quarters just off the northwest edge of the plain. These quarters (c1828), have been expanded over the years and have come to be known as Professor's Row, as they traditionally house the heads of the academic departments. The Dean's quarters were constructed in 1856 between the commandant's quarters and professor's row. A complex of structures known as the "Ordnance Compound" was completed between 1837 and 1840. It consisted of three stone buildings with two towers encircled by a wall. The building that stands in the center of the compound, now the First Class Cadet's social club, was added in 1880. The second academic building was demolished in 1891 and replaced on the same location by what was then known as the West Academic Building. This Richard Morris Hunt designed structure took four years to complete and served as the main academic hall until 1950, when it was converted into a barracks and renamed Pershing Barracks. The large house on the end of Professor's Row, known today as the "Beat Navy House" due to the "Beat Navy Sign" that hangs on its front porch, was built in 1875 and has been used as multiple officer's quarters since its construction. In 1894, McKim, Mead, and White designed and began construction on the new memorial hall, later named Cullum Hall after General George W. Cullum, who started the Cullum Register of Graduates and donated the funds for the structure. Completed in 1898, Cullum Hall broke several architectural traditions. First its classical design and white marble construction clashed with the gray granite Gothic design of the other buildings on the plain. Second, it obstructed the eastern view of the Hudson River. Started in 1900 and completed in 1903, the West Point Officer's Club also was of neo-classical design. However, budget cuts and the high cost of white marble resulted in the selection of an off-color white brick, a design that failed to inspire the imagination of the public at large and the academy leadership. These two structures are the only neo-classical designs left in the cadet area now that the old cadet chapel is moved to the cemetery.

=== 1903 design competition ===
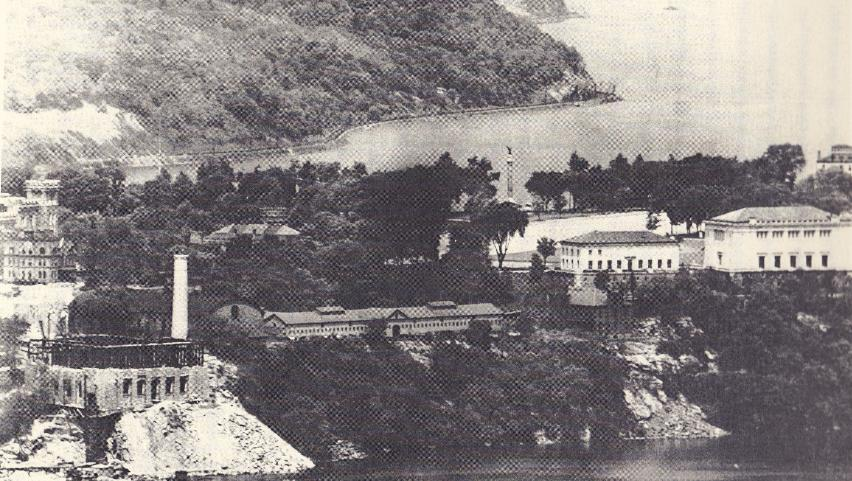
The academic area before the 1903 design completion construction.

After the turn of the century, as West Point approached its centennial, it became apparent that the campus was in need of a facilities overhaul and was lacking a clear design plan and architectural style. A major competition was held to design a major renovation of the campus, to include building a new cadet barracks (North Barracks, since demolished), chapel (the Cadet Chapel), academic building (Bartlett Hall), post headquarters (Taylor Hall), bachelor's officer quarters (Lincoln Hall), riding hall (Thayer Hall), and hotel (later the Thayer Hotel). In addition to all the construction, the winning bid had to cost less than $5,000,000. After a lengthy competition, the firm of Cram, Goodhue, & Furgeson (CGF) was selected to overhaul the academy's facilities. Nearly all of their works still stand, and their designs have influenced all other works in the cadet area since.

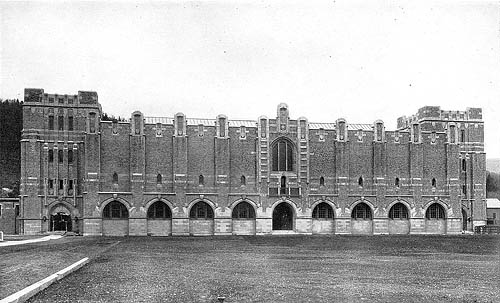
Hayes gym in 1910

The first buildings completed by CGF was the heating plant and riding hall, completed along the cliffs of the Hudson in 1909. The massive riding hall rises from the cliffs along the river to the level of the Plain. This structure served as the home of equestrian instruction until riding was removed from the curriculum during World War II. In 1958, the hall's interior was completely renovated and converted into an academic hall, renamed Thayer Hall in honor of Sylvanus Thayer. Now containing four interior floors and a large auditorium, it is considered the main academic hall on campus. In 1910, CGF completed construction of the new Headquarters building, later named Taylor Hall in honor of Maxwell Taylor. Hayes Gymnasium was also constructed by CGF and completed in 1910, replacing the Richard Morris Hunt-designed gymnasium that would be demolished to make way for the new mess hall in 1920. The "crown jewel" of CGF's project was unquestionably the new West Point Cadet Chapel, set high on the hillside above the cadet area, and completed in 1910. Upon completion of the Cadet Chapel, the Old Cadet Chapel was deconstructed and moved to the cemetery in 1911. The granite used for the construction of the Cadet Chapel was quarried from the hillside behind Hayes gymnasium, practically at the construction site. In 1913, CGF completed Bartlett Hall as one of the main academic buildings. The dirt and debris from the construction of Bartlett Hall was used to fill in "execution hollow", a large depression located on the Plain near Trophy Point. Two of CGF's buildings that have not stood the test of time were the North Barracks, which were later demolished to make way for the current MacArthur Barracks, and the cadet guardhouse, located in North Area and later demolished to make way for Scott Barracks.

=== Gradual expansion, 1920–1960 ===
After the 1903 design competition, pace of new construction at the academy slowed, but there were continual updates. Started in 1925 and completed by 1929, Washington Hall, named in honor of George Washington, became the new cadet mess hall. Designed by Arnold Brunner, Washington Hall can rightfully be considered the "center" of the cadet academic area. Due to large increase in the size of the Corps of Cadets, more barracks space was needed in the early 1930s. In 1931, Grant Hall (also called Grant Barracks) was completed on the site of the old cadet mess hall. In 1937, Paul P. Cret completed construction on Scott Barracks in North Area. Cret also oversaw an expansion of Bartlett Hall in 1938.

=== Major expansion, 1960–present ===
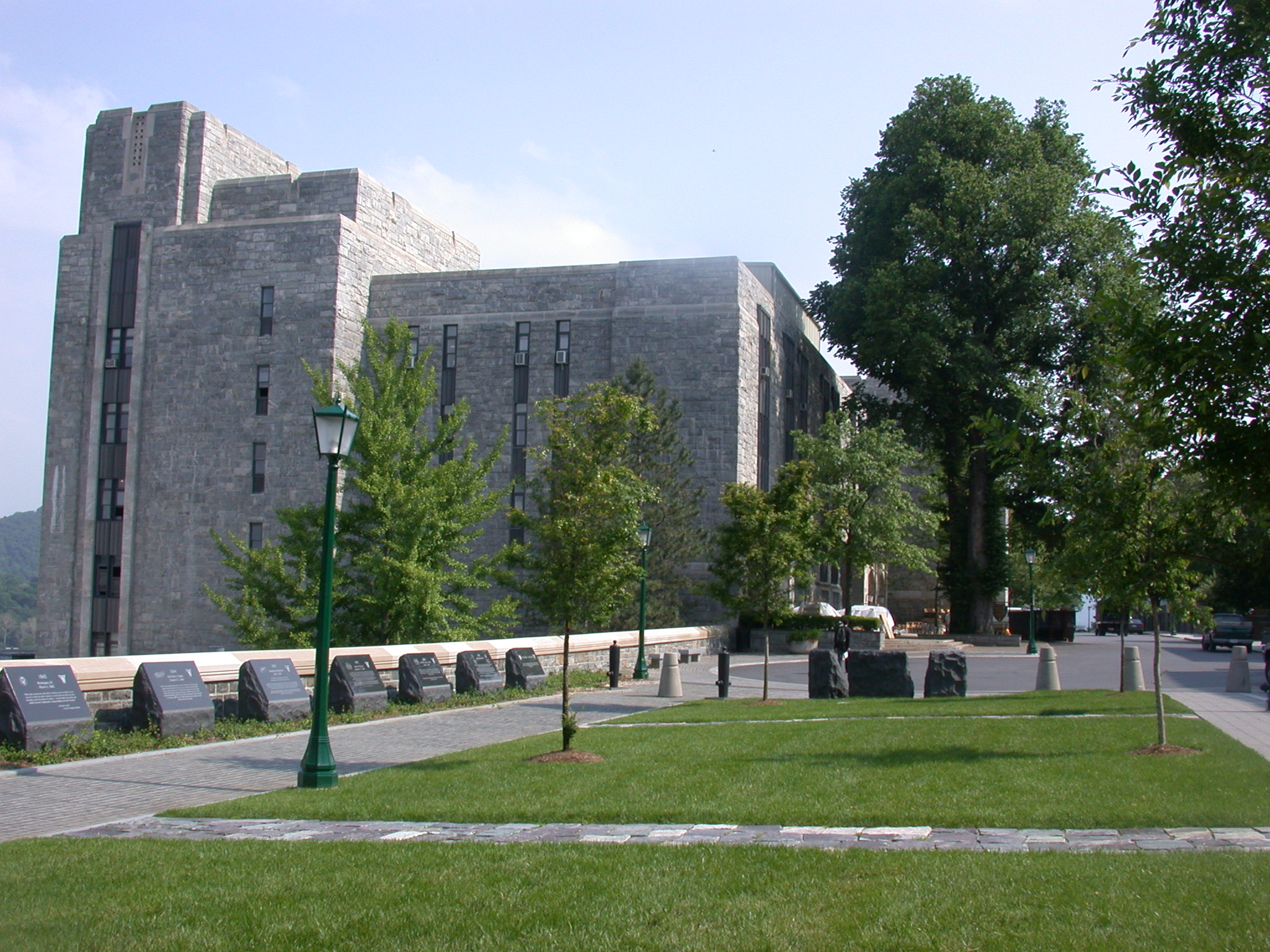
Mahan in 2003. The large American Elms can be seen on the right.

The 100% increase in the size of the Corps of Cadets in the early 1960s led to rapid expansion of facilities at the expense of preserving the historic structures on post. The central barracks, which had stood since 1851, were torn down, save one segment preserved as Nininger Hall, in order to make way for the construction of Bradley and Eisenhower Barracks between 1965 and 1972. Washington Hall was doubled in size and physically connected to Eisenhower and MacArthur Barracks, which had replaced the old North barracks. In 1969 another wing, "Mac Short", was added to MacArthur barracks. New barracks were also constructed in south area, with Lee Barracks and Sherman Barracks being constructed in the mid-1960s.

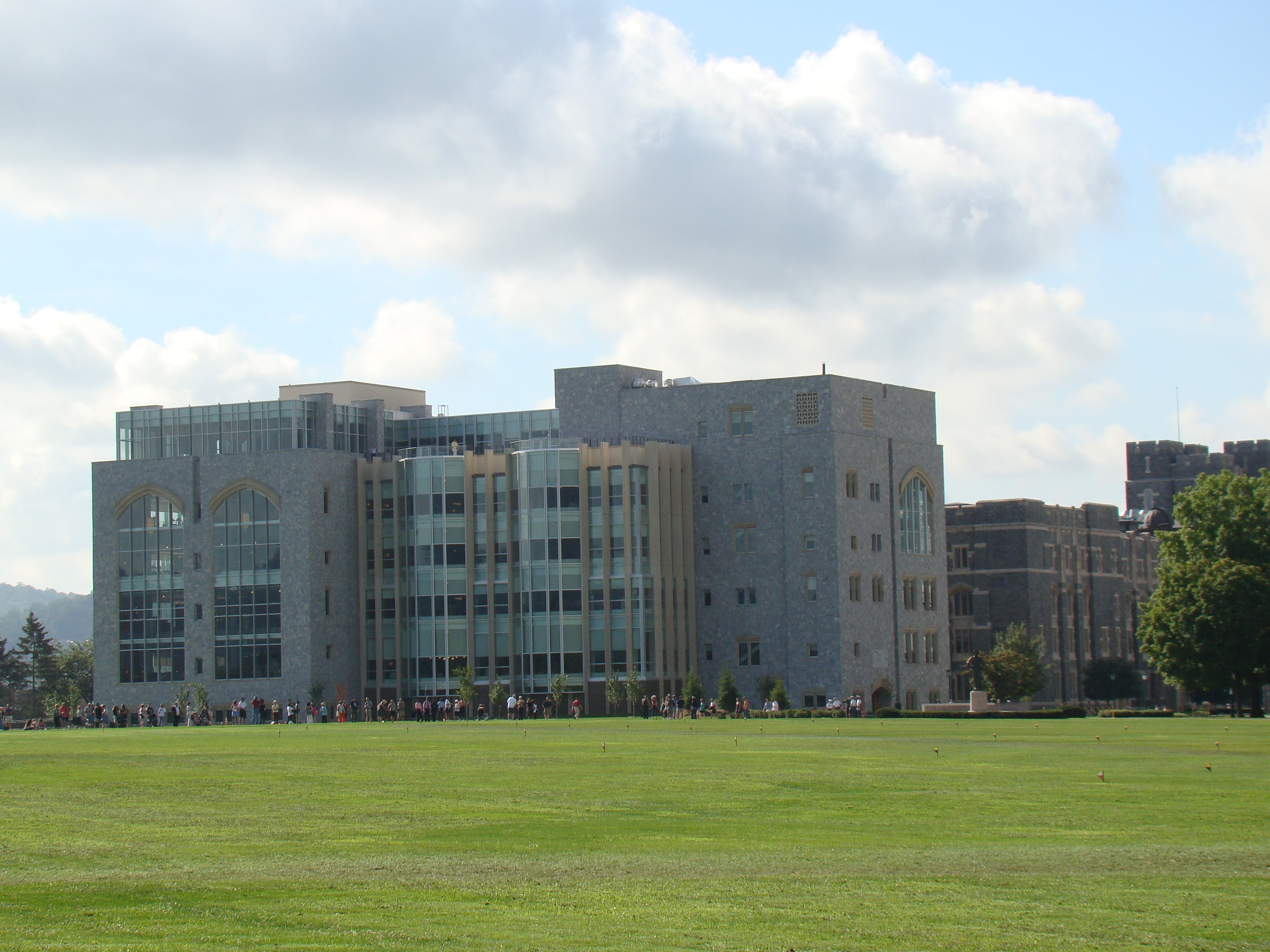
Jefferson Hall, 2009

The final major construction of the twentieth century in the academic area was the construction of Mahan Hall, named after Dennis Hart Mahan. Mahan Hall is home to the academy's Department of Civil & Mechanical Engineering and Department of Systems Engineering. It contains nine levels, over 75 classrooms and laboratories, and holds a 600-foot (180 m) lecture hall, Arnold Auditorium, in its south wing. The west entrance to Mahan Hall used to be graced by two enormous English Elm trees that were 180 years old when they succumbed to Dutch Elm Disease in 2004 and had to be removed. The most recent major construction in the academic area was the construction of the Jefferson Hall Library, which opened in 2008 on the south edge of the plain.

To help with overcrowding in the cadet area, the first major barracks construction of the 21st century began in 2015 with the construction of the new Davis Barracks at USMA by the U.S. Army Corps of Engineers, New York District. The state of the art barracks facility is for housing 650 cadets, three in each room. This construction of the Davis Barracks precedes planned renovations of other barracks at USMA to provide better quality living space for all cadets.

== Current academic halls ==
- Arvin Cadet Physical Development Center (CPDC): Named after former First Captain Carl Robert Arvin, who died in Vietnam, the gymnasium complex houses the Department of Physical Education (DPE). The original core of Arvin CPDC is Hayes Gymnasium, originally constructed in 1910. The old Arvin gym entrance was built onto it in 1934. In 1999, renovation construction tore down over half of the gym. The 1910 and 1934 sections were preserved with the new CPDC opening in 2004. The new CPDC now houses a Center for Physical Development Excellence (CPDC), offices and classrooms for DPE, new basketball, racquetball, rock climbing, survival swimming, boxing & combatives, and physical therapy facilities.
- Bartlett Hall: Home to the Departments of Chemistry and Physics, it was originally constructed in 1913 and expanded in 1937. In 2022, the Naming Commission brought public attention to a bronze plaque at the entrance of the building depicting a hooded Ku Klux Klan member; the New York Times reported its origins remained unclear.
- Hayes Gymnasium – see Arvin Cadet Physical Development Center (above)
- Jefferson Hall: Named after former president Thomas Jefferson, whose statue stands in the rotunda. The new library learning center, which opened in 2008, is home to the Center for Teaching Excellence (CTE) and the Alexander Haig Room.
- Lincoln Hall: Formerly the Bachelor Officer's Quarters, it was renovated in 1987 and now houses the Departments of English and Social Sciences.
- Old Cadet Library: Completed in 1964 and attached to Bartlett Hall, it served the Corps for over 40 years until the opening of Jefferson Hall in 2008.
- Mahan Hall: Completed in 1974, it is named after USMA alumnus Dennis Hart Mahan. Mahan Hall is home to the academy's Department of Civil & Mechanical Engineering and Department of Systems Engineering.
- Thayer Hall: Built in 1911 as a riding hall where the cadets were taught horsemanship, in 1958 it was converted into an academic hall containing over 100 classrooms. The cadet bookstore is housed on the fourth floor and there is a large lecture hall, Robinson Auditorium in the south end of the building. The first two floors of Thayer Hall are home to the Departments of History, Mathematics, Behavioral Sciences and Leadership (BS&L), and Electrical Engineering and Computer Science (EECS).
- Washington Hall: Named for President George Washington, it is the home of the Cadet Mess Hall. The upper floors of Washington Hall are home to the Department of Military Instruction (DMI), the Department of Foreign Languages (DFL), the Department of Geography & Environmental Engineering (G&ENE), and the Office of the Commandant. Washington Hall was first constructed in 1929. It was doubled in size in 1964 when the Corps expanded to 4,400 cadets.

== Chapels ==
The military chapel has played a major role in the history of the academy. In fact, attendance at weekly chapel services was mandatory until the early 1970s. The first chapel, now known as the "Old Cadet Chapel" was first constructed in 1836. It stood on the site now occupied by Bartlett Hall for 74 years until, after completion of the Cadet Chapel, it was deconstructed in 1910 and reconstructed at its current location in the cemetery.

Building	Image	Constructed	Description	Reference
Protestant Chapel		1910	Constructed in 1910 to replace the original Cadet Chapel built in 1836, the main Cadet Chapel conducts Protestant services and dominates the backdrop of the Plain.	
Catholic Chapel		1899	On the corner of Stoney Lonesome and Washington roads, the picturesque chapel was constructed in 1900, and expanded and re-dedicated in 1933.	
Jewish Chapel		1984	Built in 1984 on Merritt Road, this chapel was the culmination of 20 years of effort of the private West Point Jewish Chapel Fund.	
Old Cadet Chapel		1836	Originally completed in the cadet central area in 1836, graduates paid for the deconstruction and movement of the building in 1911 to the West Point cemetery upon completion of the current Cadet Chapel. The building remains in use and is frequently the site of funerals and memorial services. The inner walls of the building are adorned with plaques which bear the name of each general in the American Revolution. The only illegible plaque is that of Benedict Arnold, the vowels and consonants of his name scratched away by generations of unforgiving cadets.	

== Barracks ==
- Scott Barracks: Named after General Winfield Scott and built in 1938, it is home to cadets of Companies E and F and the entire Third Battalion of the Fourth Regiment. It closed in Fall 2013 for extensive renovations and reopened for the 2014–15 academic year, maintaining its distinct "division" style layout.
- Lee Barracks: Home to no cadets since Company F of the Third Regiment moved into Sherman at the end of 2021 and renovations began the next year. It was built in 1962, and is named after Colonel Robert E. Lee. In addition, it once housed the cadet barber shop in its basement, which was also removed once renovation began.
- Sherman Barracks: Built in 1962, it is home to cadets from Third Battalion, First Regiment, it is named after General William Tecumseh Sherman. It is scheduled for renovation in 2023.
- Grant Barracks: Formerly called "Old South Barracks", this building is named after General Ulysses S. Grant. The east side of these barracks is connected to Grant Hall, the former Cadet Mess Hall built in 1852 and used to feed the Corps of Cadets until 1923. The barracks portion, built in 1931, is the oldest cadet barracks still in use, and is home to cadets from Third Battalion of the Second Regiment.
- Bradley Barracks: Built in 1968, Bradley barracks is split into two sections, appropriately nicknamed "Brad Long" and "Brad Short" due to its "L" shape. The barracks was newly renovated in 2023 and currently houses Companies A through G of the Second Regiment. It is named after General of the Army Omar Bradley.
- Eisenhower Barracks: Also built in 1968, houses cadets from First and Second Battalions of the Second Regiment as well as the Cadet Brigade Staff. The barracks is named after General of the Army and former president Dwight D. Eisenhower.
- Pershing Barracks: Formerly the West Academic Building built in 1895, it was renovated in 1959 and renamed Pershing Barracks. The building is named after General of the Armies John J. Pershing and houses Third Battalion of the Third Regiment. Many cadets have nicknamed the barracks "Ritz Carlton" due to the newly renovated barracks' polished marble floors, grand entries, and opulent stairwells.
- MacArthur Barracks: Opened in 1972, it is also split into two sections nicknamed "Mac Long" and "Mac Short." "Mac Short" houses the Cadet Fourth Regiment Staff, First Battalion of the Fourth Regiment, and Company D of the Fourth Regiment. "Mac Long" houses the Third Regiment Staff and Companies A through E of Third Regiment. It is named after General of the Army Douglas MacArthur.
- Davis Barracks: Opened in 2017, the new facility houses cadets from the First Regiment. The barracks is named in honor of General Benjamin O. Davis Jr.

== Historical quarters ==
Building	Image	Constructed	Description	Reference
Quarters #100, (Superintendent)		1820	Built during the tenure of Sylvanus Thayer, the "Supe's" quarters is the second oldest residence on post, with only the Commandant's quarters being older. A mixture of Georgian and Federal architecture, it is both a private residence and a public landmark. Tours are available during certain times of the year.	
Quarters #101, (Commandant)		1819	The oldest quarters on post, built two years before the Superintendent's quarters, this three story Georgian colonial is home to the Commandant of Cadets.	
Dean's Quarters		1852	The quarters of West Point's Dean, this building sits on the corner of Washington Road and Jefferson Place, and has elements of Gothic, Victorian, & Tudor architecture. It is somewhat unusual in its "look," being one of only two quarters on post remaining in this style.	

== Other historic buildings ==
- Taylor Hall: Originally called the "Administration Building", it was built by the firm Cram, Goodhue, and Furgeson in 1910. Now named after Maxwell Taylor, it is home to the Office of the Superintendent and the Office of the Dean. This class example of "collegiate gothic" architecture sits overlooking the Hudson River to the east. With its 180-foot (55 m) tower, it is the tallest all-stone masonry building in the world.
- Cullum Hall: A large social hall containing a dance floor and several receiving rooms for formal occasions. Also known as "Cullum Memorial Hall," this building contains plaques that include the names of all West Point graduates killed in action from 1812 to the present. These plaques are located in the newly designed Memorial Room, dedicated on 10 November 2014. The lower levels contain the academy's photo studio, along with various club team practice and equipment storage areas. Academy tradition states that Plebes must know that there are "340 Lights in Cullum Hall". Cullum Hall sits directly across the road from Doubleday Field, where the New York Yankees occasionally played exhibition games in the 1920s; cadet legend states that Babe Ruth once hit a home run off the roof of Cullum Hall, a distance of over 500 feet (150 m). This legend is unlikely given that Ruth was left-handed and Cullum Hall sits beyond the left field fence, which would have made Ruth's home run to the opposite field of his power side.
- West Point Club: Originally built in 1902 as the Officer's Club and later expanded in 1963 due to a generous gift by the wife of Gen. Palmer Eddy Pierce, class of 1891. The club has named the large second floor dining room the Pierce Room in their honor.
- Nininger Hall: The last remaining structure from the old Central Barracks, the "1st Division" was traditionally home to the highest ranking cadet. Originally built in 1882, it now houses the Simon Center for the Professional Military Ethic (SCPME) and is named after LT Alexander R. Nininger, Jr., the first Medal of Honor recipient of WWII.
- Superintendent's Quarters: The oldest remaining building on post, it was built in 1820, during the tenure of COL Sylvanus Thayer.

== Athletic facilities ==
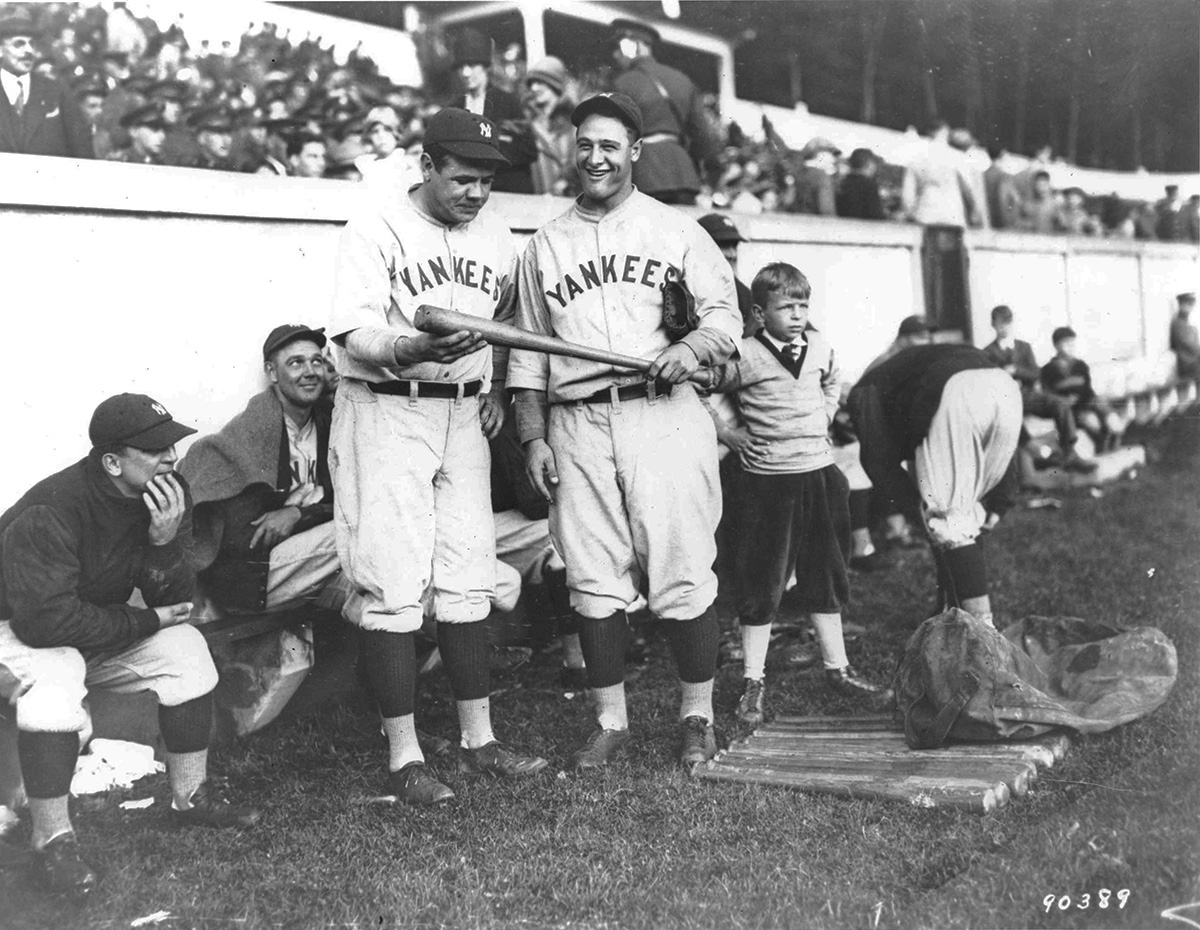
Babe Ruth & Lou Gehrig at West Point, 1927

West Point is home to many historic as well as modern athletic facilities:

- Christl Arena (part of the Holleder Center)
- Gillis Field House: Built prior to WWII and named after William G. Gillis, this facility houses the track and field program and the women's volleyball practice facilities.
- Holleder Center (Major Donald W. Holleder Center athletic complex): Next door to Michie Stadium, and built in 1985, it houses the basketball and hockey facilities. It is named after Donald W. Holleder, class of '56, who died in action in Vietnam.
- Johnson Stadium at Doubleday Field
- Michie Stadium: Originally built in 1924 and named after Dennis Michie, captain and coach of the first Army football team, it has been expanded many times over the years. The most recent addition saw the building of an expansive new training facility and offices for the football program.
- Shea Stadium: Named after Medal of Honor recipient Richard Shea in 1958, this renovated outdoor track facility is home to the track and field program and the sprint football team.
- Tate Rink (part of the Holleder Center)
- Anderson Rugby Complex: Completed in May 2007 and situated on the bank of the Hudson, Anderson Rugby Complex is home to the Army men's and women's Rugby teams.
- Clinton Field: Named after Revolutionary War hero General James Clinton, it is home to the men's and women's soccer teams.
- Softball Complex: Home to Army Softball. The field dimensions are 200 feet down the lines and 210 feet to center field. Construction was completed in 2002.
- Crandall Pool: Home to Army Swim & Dive. It is 50 meters in length and can either be set up with six lanes in the 50-meter configuration or divided into two 25-yard pools, one with eight lanes and another with six lanes. Crandall Pool also features three 1-meter diving boards, one 1-meter diving platform, two 3-meter diving boards, and a diving tower with a 7.5-meter platform and a 10-meter platform. The pool and diving platforms are also used by the Department of Physical Education for survival swimming classes (all cadets are required to take one of these classes).
- Foley Enners Nathe (FEN) Lacrosse Center: Completed and occupied in January 2017, this facility is named for classmates William Foley '67, Lt. Ray Enners '67, and Michael Nathe '67. The 15,000-square-foot-facility is nestled in the northeast corner of historic Michie Stadium, and is home to the Army West Point men's and women's lacrosse teams.

== Cemetery ==
The cemetery is situated about 3/4 of a mile north of the main academic area. Formally designated a military cemetery in 1816, it was previously known locally as "German Flats". The cemetery is the final resting place of many notable military officers and is now the location of the Old Cadet Chapel.

== Monuments ==
West Point is home to numerous monuments of famous graduates and other military heroes and patriots. Some of the monuments include:

- Eisenhower Monument. This 9-foot (2.7 m) statue of former General of the Army and the 34th President of the United States was dedicated in 1983. Designed by Robert L. Dean, class of 1953, it sits atop a pedestal of red granite and looks out over the Plain to the North.
- Kosciuszko's Monument. Dedicated in 1828 and designed by John Latrobe, the monument was originally only the base and the column. The statue was added in 1913.
- MacArthur Monument. This monument commemorates the Medal of Honor-winning former Superintendent and General of the Army Douglas MacArthur. Situated on the upper western corner of the Plain next to the north entrance to MacArthur Barracks, the monument consists of a statue of the general surrounded by angled granite walls that bear inscription excerpts from his 1962 Thayer Award address to the Corps of Cadets.
- Sedgwick Monument. Erected by former members of his command, this monument commemorates former Union General John Sedgwick and was dedicated 21 Oct 1868. The spurs of the statue freely rotate and legend states that if a cadet is in danger of failing a class, they should go to the monument in full dress uniform at midnight before the final exam. If they spin the spurs at midnight, they will pass the class.
- Thayer Monument. Commemorating the "Father of the Military Academy", this monument has been located in several locations during the academy's history. It now sits at the northwest corner of the Plain adjacent to the Beat Navy Tunnel. The monument is oriented to the south, overlooking the Plain and the central cadet area. Thayer's statue is the sight of numerous memorials throughout the year as classes return for their reunions. Tradition is for the oldest living graduate of those returning classes to lay a wreath at the foot of the memorial before the alumni review for that weekend.
- Washington Monument. Dedicated in 1916, this large statue of George Washington was moved to its current location in front of Washington Hall in 1971 when the cadet mess hall expansion was completed.

== Bibliography ==
- Forman, Sidney (1982). Hudson Highlands Hill People. Highlands, NY: Author.
- Lange, Robie (1984). Historic Structures Inventory United States Military Academy West Point, NY Vol 2. Washington, DC: National Park Service.
- Miller, Rod (2002). The Campus Guide: West Point US Military Academy. New York: Princeton Architectural Press. ISBN 1-56898-294-1.
- Palka, Eugene; Malinowski, Jon (2008). Historic West Point Photographs. Nashville, TN: Turner Publishing Co. ISBN 978-1-59652-416-3.
- West Point: Legend on the Hudson. Montgomery, NY: Poughkeepsie Journal/Walden Printing. 2003. ISBN 0-9674209-1-1.
