= Gillis Field House =

Arena in West Point, New York

- Gillis Field House
- Interactive map of Gillis Field House
- Full name: Gillis Field House
- Location: West Point, New York
- Coordinates: 41°23′49″N 73°57′39″W
- Owner: United States Military Academy
- Operator: United States Military Academy
- Capacity: 3,500

Construction
- Opened: 1938

Tenants
- Army Black Knights women's volleyball Army Black Knights track and field Army Black Knights men's basketball (1938–1985); NCAA Men's Gymnastics Championships (1950)

Gillis Field House is a 3,500-seat, multi-purpose arena in West Point, New York. It was home to the United States Military Academy's Army Black Knights men's basketball team until Christl Arena opened in 1985.

Currently, Gillis Field House is the home of the Black Knights' track and field and volleyball teams. Gillis Field House is fully equipped with locker rooms for both teams and also features coaches offices and a fully equipped training room.

== History ==
Gillis Field House is named for Maj. William G. Gillis. As a member of the West Point Class of 1941, cadet lieutenant Gillis was captain of the 1940 football team and a three-year track letterman. He was killed in action October 1, 1944 in Gremercy Forest in France during WW II. When he died, Gillis was married to Lenore Riley Mudge. Gillis received the Distinguished Service Cross, Silver Star, Bronze Star, two Purple Hearts, as well as the British Distinguished Service Order, and France’s Croix De Guerre, Silver Gilt and Vermillion Star.

Carleton R. Crowell took over the reins of the Army track and field program in 1952 and continued Army's long string of success on the track. One of the most beloved coaches at West Point, Crowell guided Army teams to 351 victories and a dozen Heptagonal championships - five indoors, three outdoors and four in cross country. All but one indoor and outdoor track and field record was shattered during his 25-year tenure.

== Track ==
Located within Gills Field House, Crowell Track is the home of Army's indoor track & field team. Crowell track features a six-lane (eight on the straightaway), 200-meter, mondo-surface oval track. This lightning-fast track incorporates the same surface as the tracks used in the Atlanta and Sydney Olympic Games. The facility is also equipped with two jumping pits, mondo pole vault runway with new UCS 1900 landing system and a mondo high jump apron with UCS landing mats. There is an indoor throwing cage and sector, as well as throwing nets to allow for discus and hammer practice.

== Baseball and softball ==
During baseball and softball's offseason period, spacious Gillis Field House transforms into the Black Knights' part-time diamond. The recently renovated field house features a Beynon track surface, three indoor pitching mounds, two pitching machines, batting cages, and a fully equipped weight room.
