= West Point Jewish Chapel =

United States Military Academy Jewish Chapel
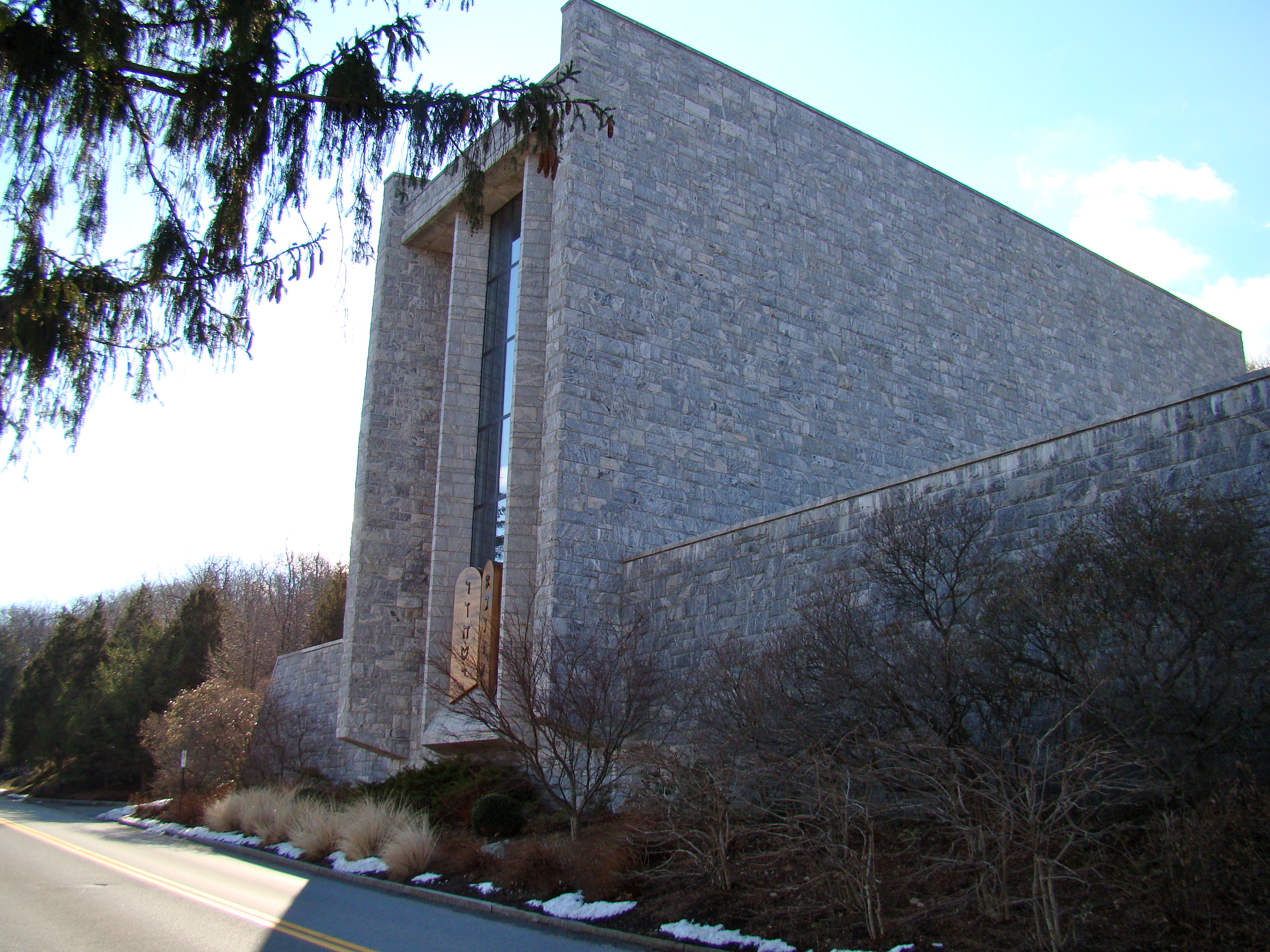
- West Point Jewish Chapel, in

- Location in New York

Religion
- Affiliation: Judaism
- Rite: Unaffiliated
- Ecclesiastical or organizational status: Synagogue and chapel
- Status: Active

Location
- Location: West Point Cemetery, United States Military Academy, West Point, New York
- Country: United States
- Interactive map of United States Military Academy Jewish Chapel
- Coordinates: 41°23′34″N 73°57′45″W

Architecture
- Founder: West Point Jewish Chapel Fund
- Completed: 1984

Website
- westpoint.edu/about/chaplain/chapels/jewish-chapel

The West Point Jewish Chapel is an unaffiliated Jewish congregation, synagogue, and chapel for United States Military Academy cadets and faculty and members of the community, located on the Academy's campus in West Point, New York, in the United States.

Construction began in 1982 and was completed on November 13, 1984, it was the culmination of 20 years of effort on the part of the West Point Jewish Chapel Fund, a private nonprofit organization which raised more than US$7.5 million for its construction.

== Gallery ==
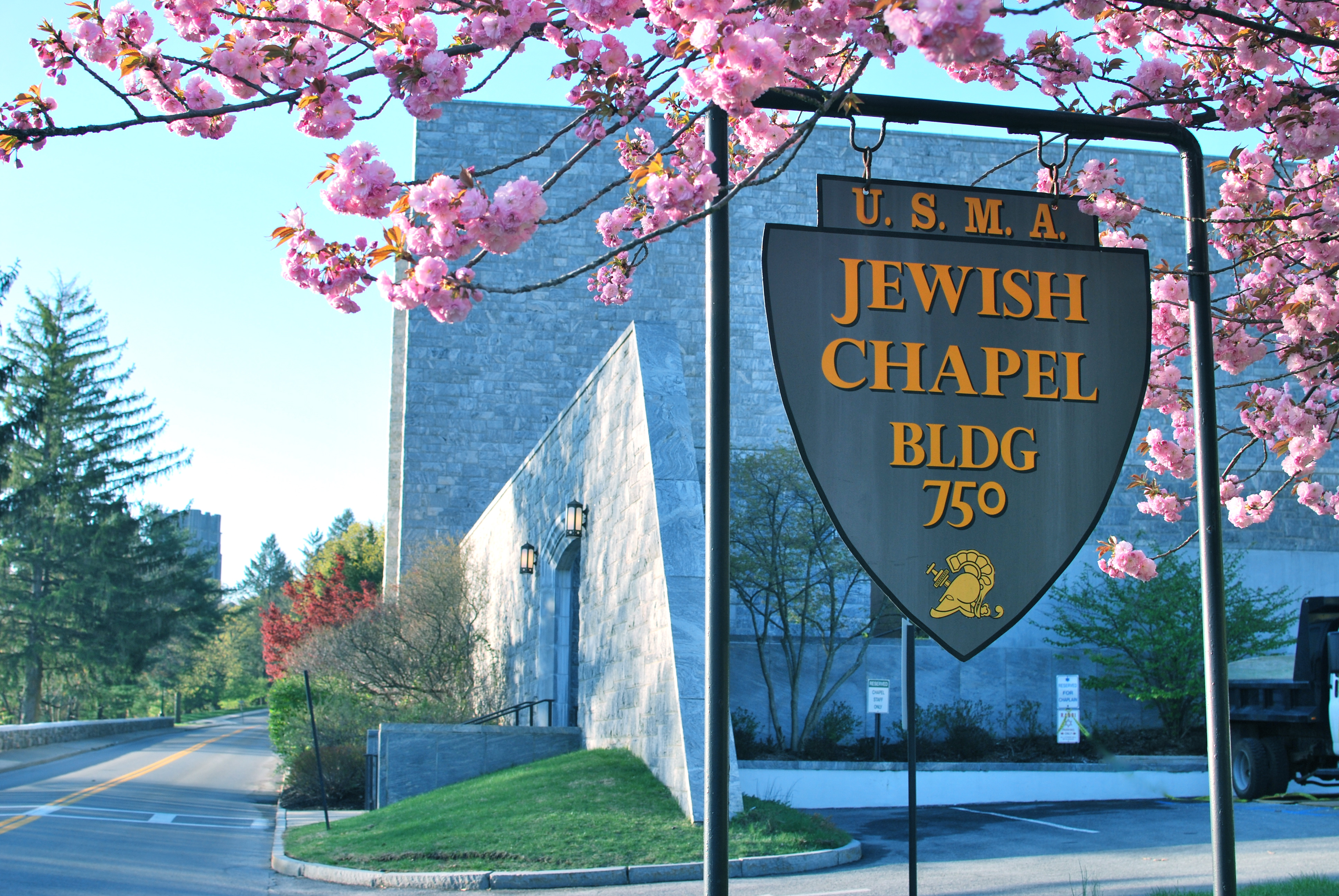
The chapel in early spring

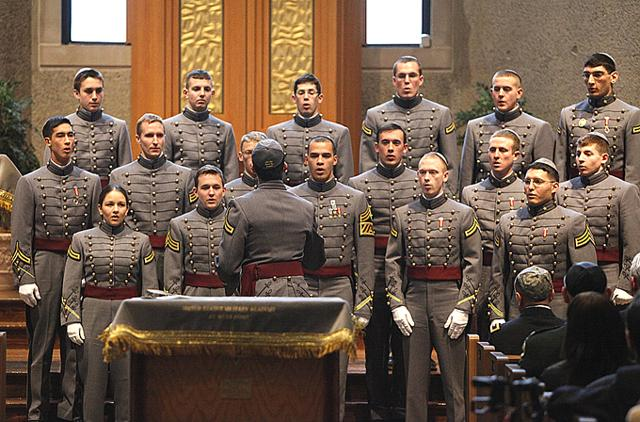
West Point Jewish Chapel Cadet Choir celebrating the chapel's 25th anniversary

== See also ==
- Religious symbolism in the United States military
- United States Military Academy chapels
