= West Point Cadet Chapel =

- Cadet Chapel, United States Military Academy
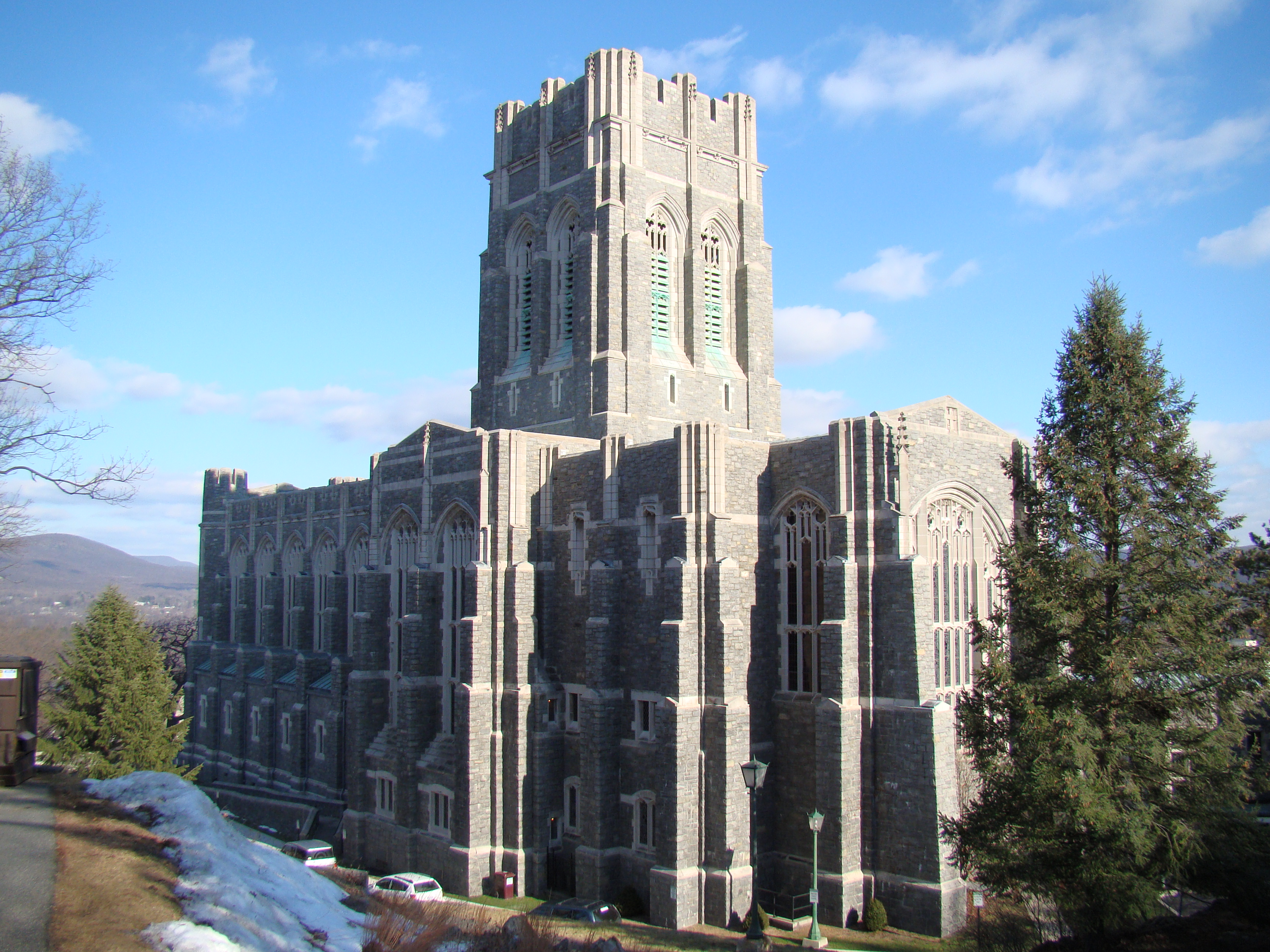
- West Point's Cadet Chapel viewed from Schofield Place
- West Point Cadet Chapel
- 41°23′24.62″N 73°57′36.01″W
- Location: United States Military Academy, New York
- Country: United States
- Denomination: Protestant Inter-Denomination

History
- Status: Church
- Dedication: 1910

Architecture
- Architect(s): Bertram Goodhue, Ralph Adams Cram, and Frank Ferguson
- Architectural type: Gothic Revival
- Groundbreaking: 1906
- Completed: 1910

Specifications
- Materials: Granite

The Cadet Chapel at the United States Military Academy is a place of Protestant denomination worship for many members of the United States Corps of Cadets. The chapel is a late example of Gothic Revival architecture, with its cruciform floor plan, soaring arches, and ornate stone carvings. It houses the largest chapel pipe organ in the world, which consists of 23,511 individual pipes. The Cadet Chapel dominates the skyline and sets the architectural mood of the academy. Designed by architect Bertram Goodhue and completed in 1910, it replaced the neoclassical Old Cadet Chapel which had been built in 1836. The Old Cadet Chapel was deconstructed and relocated to the entrance of the West Point Cemetery, where it stands today.

== See also ==
- United States Air Force Academy Cadet Chapel (including Protestant chapel)
- United States Naval Academy Chapel
- United States Merchant Marine Academy#Mariners' Memorial Chapel
