= Old Cadet Chapel (West Point) =

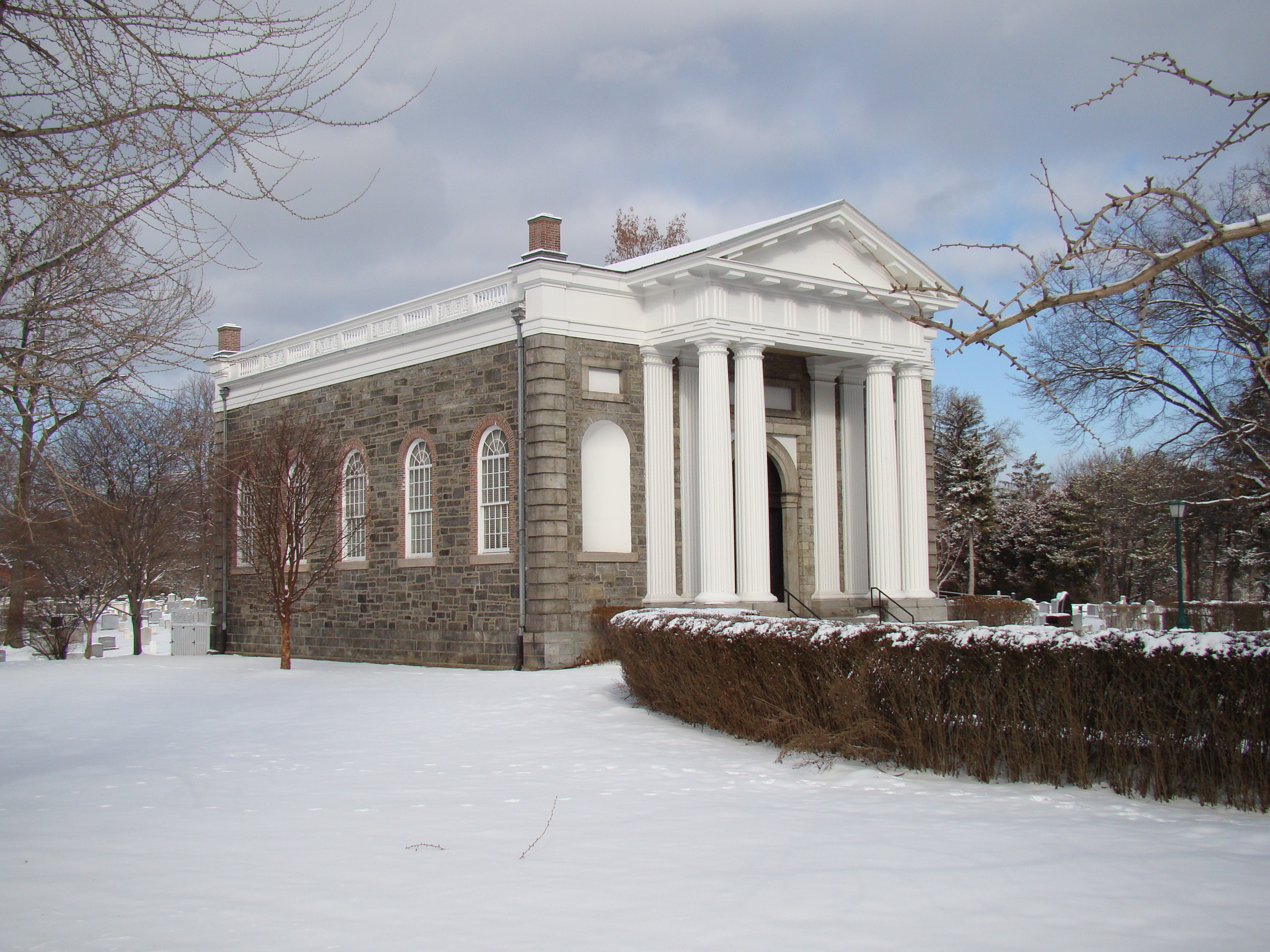
- Old Cadet Chapel
- 41°23′55″N 73°58′01″W
- Location: West Point Cemetery, United States Military Academy
- Country: United States
- Denomination: Lutheran

History
- Former name: Cadet Chapel
- Status: Church
- Founded: 1836
- Dedicated: 1910 (in current location)

Architecture
- Architectural type: Greek Revival architecture
- Completed: 1836

The Old Cadet Chapel at the United States Military Academy is a church and location of funeral and memorial services. It is the oldest chapel at West Point, having originally been built in 1836. The chapel was originally located in the cadet area near present-day Bartlett Hall, but was disassembled brick-by-brick and moved to the West Point Cemetery when the current Cadet Chapel opened in 1910. Lutheran services are held at the old chapel on Sunday mornings during the school year.

There are marble plaques on the walls commemorating the generals of the American Revolution. Benedict Arnold's plaque contains only the inscription "Major General — Born 1740", his name and the year of his death is omitted due to his treason.

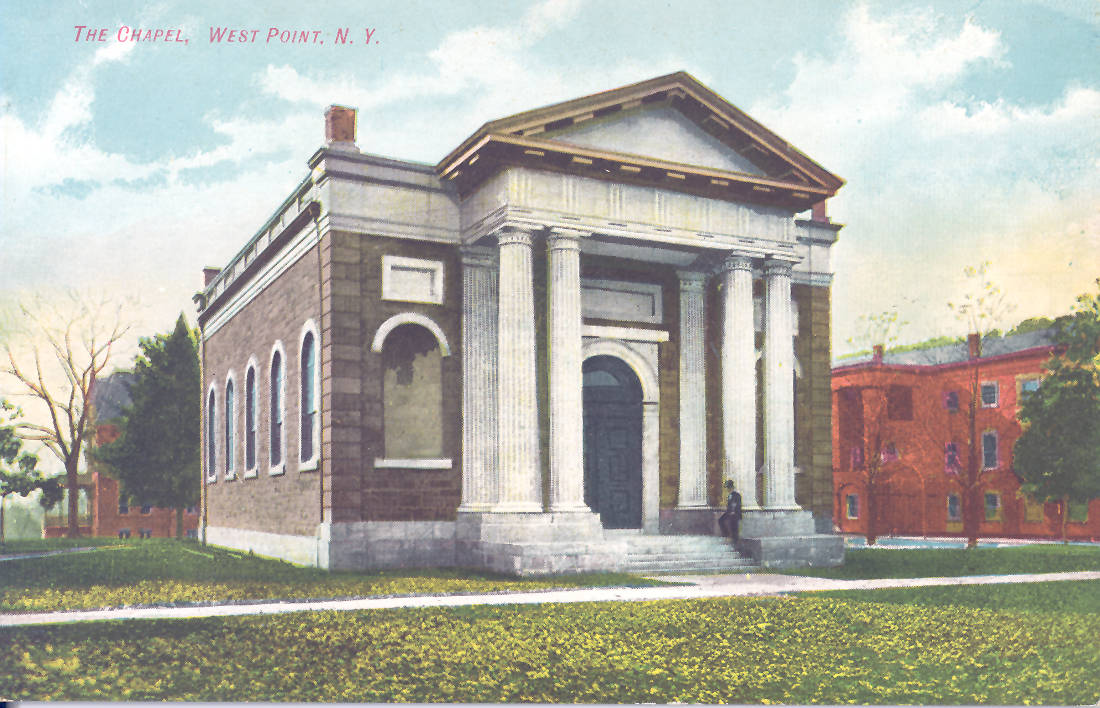
Before the chapel was moved to the cemetery

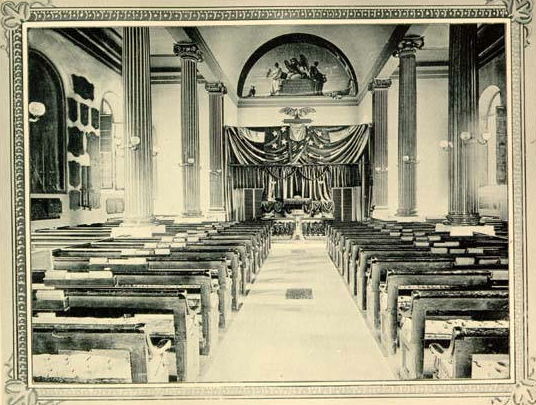
Interior, c1896

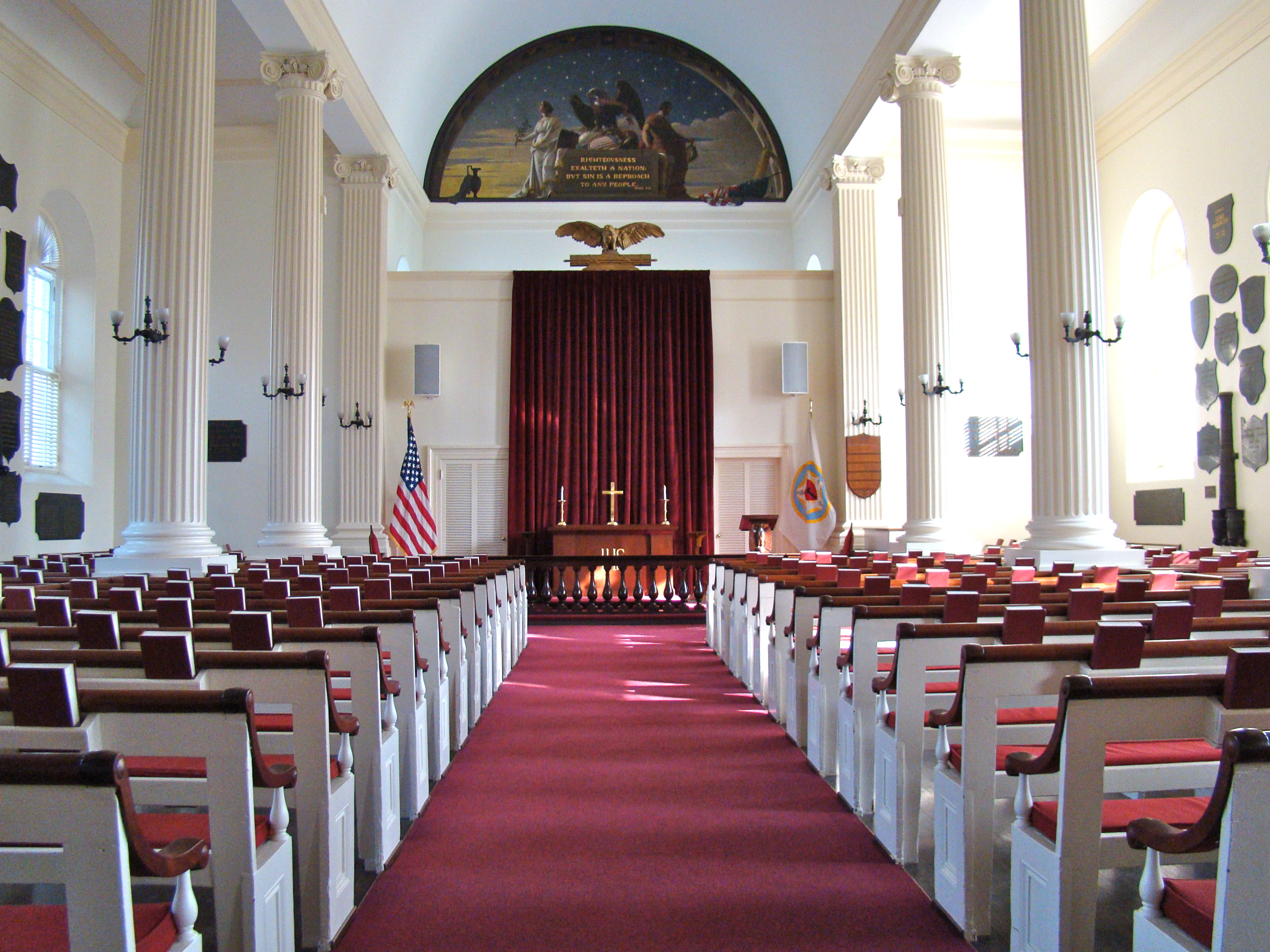
Interior, 2010
